

493001–493100 

|-bgcolor=#E9E9E9
| 493001 ||  || — || October 12, 2005 || Kitt Peak || Spacewatch || — || align=right | 1.7 km || 
|-id=002 bgcolor=#fefefe
| 493002 ||  || — || November 11, 2007 || Mount Lemmon || Mount Lemmon Survey || NYS || align=right data-sort-value="0.62" | 620 m || 
|-id=003 bgcolor=#E9E9E9
| 493003 ||  || — || January 12, 2011 || Mount Lemmon || Mount Lemmon Survey || — || align=right | 1.1 km || 
|-id=004 bgcolor=#E9E9E9
| 493004 ||  || — || October 23, 2009 || Mount Lemmon || Mount Lemmon Survey || — || align=right | 2.2 km || 
|-id=005 bgcolor=#d6d6d6
| 493005 ||  || — || March 12, 2010 || WISE || WISE || — || align=right | 3.4 km || 
|-id=006 bgcolor=#E9E9E9
| 493006 ||  || — || August 22, 2004 || Kitt Peak || Spacewatch || — || align=right | 2.3 km || 
|-id=007 bgcolor=#fefefe
| 493007 ||  || — || September 30, 2003 || Kitt Peak || Spacewatch || — || align=right data-sort-value="0.72" | 720 m || 
|-id=008 bgcolor=#E9E9E9
| 493008 ||  || — || November 5, 2010 || Kitt Peak || Spacewatch || EUN || align=right data-sort-value="0.97" | 970 m || 
|-id=009 bgcolor=#d6d6d6
| 493009 ||  || — || July 14, 2013 || Haleakala || Pan-STARRS || — || align=right | 2.4 km || 
|-id=010 bgcolor=#E9E9E9
| 493010 ||  || — || September 20, 2014 || Haleakala || Pan-STARRS || — || align=right | 2.4 km || 
|-id=011 bgcolor=#d6d6d6
| 493011 ||  || — || April 21, 2012 || Haleakala || Pan-STARRS || — || align=right | 2.4 km || 
|-id=012 bgcolor=#d6d6d6
| 493012 ||  || — || April 2, 2006 || Kitt Peak || Spacewatch || — || align=right | 2.9 km || 
|-id=013 bgcolor=#d6d6d6
| 493013 ||  || — || September 4, 2014 || Haleakala || Pan-STARRS || — || align=right | 3.2 km || 
|-id=014 bgcolor=#E9E9E9
| 493014 ||  || — || December 5, 2010 || Kitt Peak || Spacewatch || — || align=right | 2.1 km || 
|-id=015 bgcolor=#d6d6d6
| 493015 ||  || — || January 26, 2011 || Mount Lemmon || Mount Lemmon Survey || EOS || align=right | 2.5 km || 
|-id=016 bgcolor=#d6d6d6
| 493016 ||  || — || July 1, 2013 || Haleakala || Pan-STARRS || — || align=right | 2.7 km || 
|-id=017 bgcolor=#d6d6d6
| 493017 ||  || — || September 20, 2014 || Haleakala || Pan-STARRS || — || align=right | 2.8 km || 
|-id=018 bgcolor=#d6d6d6
| 493018 ||  || — || April 2, 2011 || Haleakala || Pan-STARRS || EOS || align=right | 2.4 km || 
|-id=019 bgcolor=#d6d6d6
| 493019 ||  || — || February 25, 2011 || Mount Lemmon || Mount Lemmon Survey || EOS || align=right | 1.6 km || 
|-id=020 bgcolor=#E9E9E9
| 493020 ||  || — || March 31, 2003 || Kitt Peak || Spacewatch || — || align=right | 2.6 km || 
|-id=021 bgcolor=#d6d6d6
| 493021 ||  || — || December 17, 2003 || Kitt Peak || Spacewatch || — || align=right | 3.2 km || 
|-id=022 bgcolor=#d6d6d6
| 493022 ||  || — || August 30, 2008 || La Sagra || OAM Obs. || EOS || align=right | 2.5 km || 
|-id=023 bgcolor=#d6d6d6
| 493023 ||  || — || September 20, 2014 || Haleakala || Pan-STARRS || — || align=right | 2.8 km || 
|-id=024 bgcolor=#E9E9E9
| 493024 ||  || — || May 16, 2005 || Kitt Peak || Spacewatch || — || align=right | 1.0 km || 
|-id=025 bgcolor=#E9E9E9
| 493025 ||  || — || September 14, 2014 || Kitt Peak || Spacewatch || — || align=right | 2.2 km || 
|-id=026 bgcolor=#d6d6d6
| 493026 ||  || — || August 22, 2014 || Haleakala || Pan-STARRS || BRA || align=right | 1.6 km || 
|-id=027 bgcolor=#E9E9E9
| 493027 ||  || — || March 15, 2008 || Kitt Peak || Spacewatch || — || align=right | 1.5 km || 
|-id=028 bgcolor=#E9E9E9
| 493028 ||  || — || January 17, 2007 || Kitt Peak || Spacewatch || — || align=right | 1.4 km || 
|-id=029 bgcolor=#d6d6d6
| 493029 ||  || — || September 18, 2014 || Haleakala || Pan-STARRS || — || align=right | 2.8 km || 
|-id=030 bgcolor=#d6d6d6
| 493030 ||  || — || January 4, 2011 || Mount Lemmon || Mount Lemmon Survey || — || align=right | 3.1 km || 
|-id=031 bgcolor=#fefefe
| 493031 ||  || — || September 5, 2010 || La Sagra || OAM Obs. || — || align=right | 1.0 km || 
|-id=032 bgcolor=#d6d6d6
| 493032 ||  || — || April 13, 2012 || Haleakala || Pan-STARRS || KOR || align=right | 1.3 km || 
|-id=033 bgcolor=#fefefe
| 493033 ||  || — || February 1, 2009 || Kitt Peak || Spacewatch || MAS || align=right data-sort-value="0.79" | 790 m || 
|-id=034 bgcolor=#E9E9E9
| 493034 ||  || — || October 26, 2005 || Kitt Peak || Spacewatch || — || align=right | 2.0 km || 
|-id=035 bgcolor=#E9E9E9
| 493035 ||  || — || March 28, 2008 || Kitt Peak || Spacewatch || — || align=right | 1.8 km || 
|-id=036 bgcolor=#d6d6d6
| 493036 ||  || — || April 18, 2007 || Mount Lemmon || Mount Lemmon Survey || EOS || align=right | 1.8 km || 
|-id=037 bgcolor=#d6d6d6
| 493037 ||  || — || March 2, 2012 || Kitt Peak || Spacewatch || EOS || align=right | 2.0 km || 
|-id=038 bgcolor=#d6d6d6
| 493038 ||  || — || September 25, 2009 || Catalina || CSS || — || align=right | 3.4 km || 
|-id=039 bgcolor=#E9E9E9
| 493039 ||  || — || November 8, 2010 || Kitt Peak || Spacewatch || — || align=right | 2.0 km || 
|-id=040 bgcolor=#E9E9E9
| 493040 ||  || — || October 4, 2006 || Mount Lemmon || Mount Lemmon Survey || — || align=right data-sort-value="0.98" | 980 m || 
|-id=041 bgcolor=#d6d6d6
| 493041 ||  || — || October 18, 2009 || Catalina || CSS || — || align=right | 2.8 km || 
|-id=042 bgcolor=#d6d6d6
| 493042 ||  || — || September 2, 2014 || Haleakala || Pan-STARRS || — || align=right | 3.2 km || 
|-id=043 bgcolor=#fefefe
| 493043 ||  || — || September 12, 2007 || Mount Lemmon || Mount Lemmon Survey || — || align=right data-sort-value="0.68" | 680 m || 
|-id=044 bgcolor=#d6d6d6
| 493044 ||  || — || August 17, 2009 || Kitt Peak || Spacewatch || — || align=right | 2.1 km || 
|-id=045 bgcolor=#FA8072
| 493045 ||  || — || August 22, 1999 || Catalina || CSS || — || align=right data-sort-value="0.94" | 940 m || 
|-id=046 bgcolor=#E9E9E9
| 493046 ||  || — || November 16, 2006 || Mount Lemmon || Mount Lemmon Survey || — || align=right | 1.6 km || 
|-id=047 bgcolor=#E9E9E9
| 493047 ||  || — || October 9, 2010 || Mount Lemmon || Mount Lemmon Survey || — || align=right | 1.5 km || 
|-id=048 bgcolor=#fefefe
| 493048 ||  || — || July 4, 2010 || Mount Lemmon || Mount Lemmon Survey || — || align=right data-sort-value="0.73" | 730 m || 
|-id=049 bgcolor=#d6d6d6
| 493049 ||  || — || September 19, 2014 || Haleakala || Pan-STARRS || BRA || align=right | 1.6 km || 
|-id=050 bgcolor=#d6d6d6
| 493050 ||  || — || July 5, 2014 || Haleakala || Pan-STARRS || — || align=right | 3.8 km || 
|-id=051 bgcolor=#E9E9E9
| 493051 ||  || — || October 5, 2005 || Mount Lemmon || Mount Lemmon Survey || — || align=right | 2.6 km || 
|-id=052 bgcolor=#d6d6d6
| 493052 ||  || — || April 13, 2012 || Haleakala || Pan-STARRS || — || align=right | 3.0 km || 
|-id=053 bgcolor=#d6d6d6
| 493053 ||  || — || March 13, 2011 || Kitt Peak || Spacewatch || THM || align=right | 2.6 km || 
|-id=054 bgcolor=#d6d6d6
| 493054 ||  || — || February 28, 2012 || Haleakala || Pan-STARRS || — || align=right | 2.1 km || 
|-id=055 bgcolor=#d6d6d6
| 493055 ||  || — || November 15, 2003 || Kitt Peak || Spacewatch || — || align=right | 3.0 km || 
|-id=056 bgcolor=#d6d6d6
| 493056 ||  || — || September 22, 2014 || Kitt Peak || Spacewatch || — || align=right | 2.9 km || 
|-id=057 bgcolor=#E9E9E9
| 493057 ||  || — || November 5, 2010 || Kitt Peak || Spacewatch || — || align=right | 1.3 km || 
|-id=058 bgcolor=#d6d6d6
| 493058 ||  || — || November 20, 2009 || Kitt Peak || Spacewatch || — || align=right | 2.7 km || 
|-id=059 bgcolor=#d6d6d6
| 493059 ||  || — || September 22, 2014 || Kitt Peak || Spacewatch || — || align=right | 2.7 km || 
|-id=060 bgcolor=#d6d6d6
| 493060 ||  || — || December 13, 2009 || Mount Lemmon || Mount Lemmon Survey || — || align=right | 3.2 km || 
|-id=061 bgcolor=#E9E9E9
| 493061 ||  || — || October 25, 2005 || Kitt Peak || Spacewatch || — || align=right | 1.9 km || 
|-id=062 bgcolor=#E9E9E9
| 493062 ||  || — || November 6, 2010 || Mount Lemmon || Mount Lemmon Survey || — || align=right | 1.0 km || 
|-id=063 bgcolor=#d6d6d6
| 493063 ||  || — || October 24, 2003 || Kitt Peak || Spacewatch || — || align=right | 2.6 km || 
|-id=064 bgcolor=#d6d6d6
| 493064 ||  || — || October 18, 2003 || Kitt Peak || Spacewatch || — || align=right | 2.5 km || 
|-id=065 bgcolor=#d6d6d6
| 493065 ||  || — || September 2, 2014 || Haleakala || Pan-STARRS || — || align=right | 3.4 km || 
|-id=066 bgcolor=#d6d6d6
| 493066 ||  || — || September 28, 2003 || Kitt Peak || Spacewatch || EOS || align=right | 2.4 km || 
|-id=067 bgcolor=#d6d6d6
| 493067 ||  || — || September 23, 2009 || Mount Lemmon || Mount Lemmon Survey || BRA || align=right | 1.8 km || 
|-id=068 bgcolor=#d6d6d6
| 493068 ||  || — || April 17, 2010 || WISE || WISE || Tj (2.94) || align=right | 3.5 km || 
|-id=069 bgcolor=#E9E9E9
| 493069 ||  || — || March 15, 2012 || Mount Lemmon || Mount Lemmon Survey || — || align=right | 2.5 km || 
|-id=070 bgcolor=#E9E9E9
| 493070 ||  || — || August 1, 2009 || Kitt Peak || Spacewatch || — || align=right | 2.9 km || 
|-id=071 bgcolor=#d6d6d6
| 493071 ||  || — || November 18, 2003 || Kitt Peak || Spacewatch || VER || align=right | 2.5 km || 
|-id=072 bgcolor=#d6d6d6
| 493072 ||  || — || October 27, 2009 || Kitt Peak || Spacewatch || EOS || align=right | 2.0 km || 
|-id=073 bgcolor=#d6d6d6
| 493073 ||  || — || October 3, 2003 || Kitt Peak || Spacewatch || EOS || align=right | 1.6 km || 
|-id=074 bgcolor=#d6d6d6
| 493074 ||  || — || September 25, 2014 || Kitt Peak || Spacewatch || — || align=right | 3.0 km || 
|-id=075 bgcolor=#d6d6d6
| 493075 ||  || — || August 21, 2008 || Kitt Peak || Spacewatch || — || align=right | 2.6 km || 
|-id=076 bgcolor=#E9E9E9
| 493076 ||  || — || October 10, 2005 || Kitt Peak || Spacewatch || — || align=right | 2.3 km || 
|-id=077 bgcolor=#d6d6d6
| 493077 ||  || — || April 19, 2012 || Mount Lemmon || Mount Lemmon Survey || — || align=right | 2.5 km || 
|-id=078 bgcolor=#d6d6d6
| 493078 ||  || — || April 12, 2010 || WISE || WISE || 7:4 || align=right | 4.0 km || 
|-id=079 bgcolor=#d6d6d6
| 493079 ||  || — || September 24, 2014 || Mount Lemmon || Mount Lemmon Survey || — || align=right | 3.4 km || 
|-id=080 bgcolor=#d6d6d6
| 493080 ||  || — || May 12, 2012 || Mount Lemmon || Mount Lemmon Survey || — || align=right | 3.7 km || 
|-id=081 bgcolor=#d6d6d6
| 493081 ||  || — || November 25, 2009 || Kitt Peak || Spacewatch || — || align=right | 2.6 km || 
|-id=082 bgcolor=#d6d6d6
| 493082 ||  || — || September 26, 2014 || Kitt Peak || Spacewatch || 7:4 || align=right | 2.8 km || 
|-id=083 bgcolor=#E9E9E9
| 493083 ||  || — || March 13, 2012 || Kitt Peak || Spacewatch || — || align=right | 2.1 km || 
|-id=084 bgcolor=#E9E9E9
| 493084 ||  || — || April 15, 2013 || Haleakala || Pan-STARRS || AEO || align=right | 1.3 km || 
|-id=085 bgcolor=#E9E9E9
| 493085 ||  || — || September 2, 2014 || Haleakala || Pan-STARRS || — || align=right | 1.9 km || 
|-id=086 bgcolor=#d6d6d6
| 493086 ||  || — || February 2, 2010 || WISE || WISE || — || align=right | 2.8 km || 
|-id=087 bgcolor=#d6d6d6
| 493087 ||  || — || September 3, 2008 || Kitt Peak || Spacewatch || HYG || align=right | 2.7 km || 
|-id=088 bgcolor=#E9E9E9
| 493088 ||  || — || October 25, 2005 || Kitt Peak || Spacewatch || AST || align=right | 1.6 km || 
|-id=089 bgcolor=#d6d6d6
| 493089 ||  || — || April 19, 2007 || Mount Lemmon || Mount Lemmon Survey || — || align=right | 2.4 km || 
|-id=090 bgcolor=#E9E9E9
| 493090 ||  || — || October 13, 2005 || Kitt Peak || Spacewatch ||  || align=right | 1.8 km || 
|-id=091 bgcolor=#E9E9E9
| 493091 ||  || — || October 25, 2005 || Mount Lemmon || Mount Lemmon Survey || — || align=right | 2.0 km || 
|-id=092 bgcolor=#E9E9E9
| 493092 ||  || — || September 19, 2001 || Kitt Peak || Spacewatch || — || align=right | 1.5 km || 
|-id=093 bgcolor=#d6d6d6
| 493093 ||  || — || March 26, 1995 || Kitt Peak || Spacewatch || — || align=right | 3.9 km || 
|-id=094 bgcolor=#E9E9E9
| 493094 ||  || — || October 1, 2005 || Mount Lemmon || Mount Lemmon Survey || PAD || align=right | 1.4 km || 
|-id=095 bgcolor=#E9E9E9
| 493095 ||  || — || November 1, 2010 || Mount Lemmon || Mount Lemmon Survey || — || align=right data-sort-value="0.99" | 990 m || 
|-id=096 bgcolor=#d6d6d6
| 493096 ||  || — || June 19, 2007 || Kitt Peak || Spacewatch || — || align=right | 3.2 km || 
|-id=097 bgcolor=#d6d6d6
| 493097 ||  || — || December 13, 2009 || Mount Lemmon || Mount Lemmon Survey || EMA || align=right | 2.9 km || 
|-id=098 bgcolor=#d6d6d6
| 493098 ||  || — || October 2, 2003 || Kitt Peak || Spacewatch || EOS || align=right | 2.1 km || 
|-id=099 bgcolor=#d6d6d6
| 493099 ||  || — || September 19, 2014 || Haleakala || Pan-STARRS || — || align=right | 2.7 km || 
|-id=100 bgcolor=#E9E9E9
| 493100 ||  || — || November 3, 2005 || Kitt Peak || Spacewatch || AGN || align=right | 1.3 km || 
|}

493101–493200 

|-bgcolor=#d6d6d6
| 493101 ||  || — || April 20, 2007 || Kitt Peak || Spacewatch || — || align=right | 3.5 km || 
|-id=102 bgcolor=#E9E9E9
| 493102 ||  || — || November 20, 2006 || Kitt Peak || Spacewatch || — || align=right | 1.1 km || 
|-id=103 bgcolor=#d6d6d6
| 493103 ||  || — || October 24, 2009 || Kitt Peak || Spacewatch || — || align=right | 2.1 km || 
|-id=104 bgcolor=#E9E9E9
| 493104 ||  || — || April 13, 2008 || Kitt Peak || Spacewatch || — || align=right | 1.9 km || 
|-id=105 bgcolor=#d6d6d6
| 493105 ||  || — || March 23, 2006 || Kitt Peak || Spacewatch || — || align=right | 3.9 km || 
|-id=106 bgcolor=#fefefe
| 493106 ||  || — || November 4, 2004 || Kitt Peak || Spacewatch || — || align=right data-sort-value="0.54" | 540 m || 
|-id=107 bgcolor=#E9E9E9
| 493107 ||  || — || August 19, 2014 || Haleakala || Pan-STARRS || — || align=right | 1.1 km || 
|-id=108 bgcolor=#d6d6d6
| 493108 ||  || — || November 16, 2009 || Mount Lemmon || Mount Lemmon Survey || — || align=right | 2.0 km || 
|-id=109 bgcolor=#E9E9E9
| 493109 ||  || — || September 12, 2009 || Kitt Peak || Spacewatch || AGN || align=right | 1.2 km || 
|-id=110 bgcolor=#d6d6d6
| 493110 ||  || — || September 23, 2014 || Kitt Peak || Spacewatch || EOS || align=right | 1.8 km || 
|-id=111 bgcolor=#fefefe
| 493111 ||  || — || September 24, 1960 || Palomar || PLS || — || align=right data-sort-value="0.85" | 850 m || 
|-id=112 bgcolor=#d6d6d6
| 493112 ||  || — || May 14, 2012 || Haleakala || Pan-STARRS || EOS || align=right | 2.2 km || 
|-id=113 bgcolor=#E9E9E9
| 493113 ||  || — || August 30, 2005 || Kitt Peak || Spacewatch || — || align=right | 1.3 km || 
|-id=114 bgcolor=#E9E9E9
| 493114 ||  || — || October 1, 2014 || Haleakala || Pan-STARRS || — || align=right | 2.2 km || 
|-id=115 bgcolor=#d6d6d6
| 493115 ||  || — || September 3, 2014 || Mount Lemmon || Mount Lemmon Survey || — || align=right | 3.2 km || 
|-id=116 bgcolor=#d6d6d6
| 493116 ||  || — || April 3, 2010 || WISE || WISE || 7:4 || align=right | 4.8 km || 
|-id=117 bgcolor=#d6d6d6
| 493117 ||  || — || October 1, 2014 || Kitt Peak || Spacewatch || — || align=right | 2.9 km || 
|-id=118 bgcolor=#E9E9E9
| 493118 ||  || — || May 12, 2013 || Haleakala || Pan-STARRS || MAR || align=right | 1.0 km || 
|-id=119 bgcolor=#d6d6d6
| 493119 ||  || — || October 2, 2014 || Haleakala || Pan-STARRS || — || align=right | 3.1 km || 
|-id=120 bgcolor=#d6d6d6
| 493120 ||  || — || October 18, 2003 || Kitt Peak || Spacewatch || — || align=right | 3.1 km || 
|-id=121 bgcolor=#E9E9E9
| 493121 ||  || — || March 27, 2008 || Kitt Peak || Spacewatch || — || align=right | 2.6 km || 
|-id=122 bgcolor=#E9E9E9
| 493122 ||  || — || August 16, 2009 || Kitt Peak || Spacewatch || — || align=right | 2.3 km || 
|-id=123 bgcolor=#E9E9E9
| 493123 ||  || — || November 4, 2005 || Mount Lemmon || Mount Lemmon Survey || — || align=right | 2.6 km || 
|-id=124 bgcolor=#d6d6d6
| 493124 ||  || — || April 12, 2010 || WISE || WISE || — || align=right | 4.7 km || 
|-id=125 bgcolor=#E9E9E9
| 493125 ||  || — || November 1, 2005 || Kitt Peak || Spacewatch || — || align=right | 2.2 km || 
|-id=126 bgcolor=#d6d6d6
| 493126 ||  || — || September 21, 2003 || Kitt Peak || Spacewatch || EOS || align=right | 2.0 km || 
|-id=127 bgcolor=#d6d6d6
| 493127 ||  || — || April 9, 2006 || Kitt Peak || Spacewatch || — || align=right | 3.4 km || 
|-id=128 bgcolor=#d6d6d6
| 493128 ||  || — || October 20, 2003 || Kitt Peak || Spacewatch || — || align=right | 3.0 km || 
|-id=129 bgcolor=#E9E9E9
| 493129 ||  || — || October 28, 2005 || Mount Lemmon || Mount Lemmon Survey || AGN || align=right | 1.3 km || 
|-id=130 bgcolor=#E9E9E9
| 493130 ||  || — || July 3, 2005 || Mount Lemmon || Mount Lemmon Survey || — || align=right | 1.5 km || 
|-id=131 bgcolor=#E9E9E9
| 493131 ||  || — || August 15, 2009 || Kitt Peak || Spacewatch || AGN || align=right | 1.2 km || 
|-id=132 bgcolor=#E9E9E9
| 493132 ||  || — || April 16, 2013 || Haleakala || Pan-STARRS || ADE || align=right | 2.3 km || 
|-id=133 bgcolor=#d6d6d6
| 493133 ||  || — || March 14, 2007 || Mount Lemmon || Mount Lemmon Survey || — || align=right | 2.7 km || 
|-id=134 bgcolor=#d6d6d6
| 493134 ||  || — || September 29, 1992 || Kitt Peak || Spacewatch || — || align=right | 2.1 km || 
|-id=135 bgcolor=#d6d6d6
| 493135 ||  || — || September 28, 2003 || Kitt Peak || Spacewatch || — || align=right | 2.5 km || 
|-id=136 bgcolor=#d6d6d6
| 493136 ||  || — || March 31, 2011 || Haleakala || Pan-STARRS || 7:4 || align=right | 3.6 km || 
|-id=137 bgcolor=#d6d6d6
| 493137 ||  || — || October 22, 2009 || Mount Lemmon || Mount Lemmon Survey || — || align=right | 2.1 km || 
|-id=138 bgcolor=#d6d6d6
| 493138 ||  || — || November 15, 2003 || Kitt Peak || Spacewatch || — || align=right | 2.8 km || 
|-id=139 bgcolor=#d6d6d6
| 493139 ||  || — || March 16, 2007 || Mount Lemmon || Mount Lemmon Survey || KOR || align=right | 1.4 km || 
|-id=140 bgcolor=#d6d6d6
| 493140 ||  || — || November 18, 2003 || Kitt Peak || Spacewatch || — || align=right | 2.6 km || 
|-id=141 bgcolor=#E9E9E9
| 493141 ||  || — || September 11, 2010 || Mount Lemmon || Mount Lemmon Survey || — || align=right | 1.1 km || 
|-id=142 bgcolor=#d6d6d6
| 493142 ||  || — || November 17, 2009 || Mount Lemmon || Mount Lemmon Survey || — || align=right | 2.6 km || 
|-id=143 bgcolor=#d6d6d6
| 493143 ||  || — || March 31, 2011 || Haleakala || Pan-STARRS || EOS || align=right | 1.6 km || 
|-id=144 bgcolor=#d6d6d6
| 493144 ||  || — || October 22, 2009 || Mount Lemmon || Mount Lemmon Survey || EOS || align=right | 2.0 km || 
|-id=145 bgcolor=#fefefe
| 493145 ||  || — || May 7, 2010 || WISE || WISE || — || align=right | 1.1 km || 
|-id=146 bgcolor=#d6d6d6
| 493146 ||  || — || September 17, 2009 || Kitt Peak || Spacewatch || NAE || align=right | 2.5 km || 
|-id=147 bgcolor=#d6d6d6
| 493147 ||  || — || August 4, 2013 || Haleakala || Pan-STARRS || ANF || align=right | 1.5 km || 
|-id=148 bgcolor=#d6d6d6
| 493148 ||  || — || March 9, 2011 || Kitt Peak || Spacewatch || VER || align=right | 2.8 km || 
|-id=149 bgcolor=#d6d6d6
| 493149 ||  || — || April 22, 2007 || Kitt Peak || Spacewatch || — || align=right | 3.5 km || 
|-id=150 bgcolor=#E9E9E9
| 493150 ||  || — || May 20, 2004 || Kitt Peak || Spacewatch || — || align=right | 2.4 km || 
|-id=151 bgcolor=#d6d6d6
| 493151 ||  || — || September 17, 2009 || Kitt Peak || Spacewatch || EOS || align=right | 2.1 km || 
|-id=152 bgcolor=#d6d6d6
| 493152 ||  || — || October 12, 1998 || Kitt Peak || Spacewatch || — || align=right | 2.9 km || 
|-id=153 bgcolor=#d6d6d6
| 493153 ||  || — || May 21, 2012 || Mount Lemmon || Mount Lemmon Survey || — || align=right | 3.0 km || 
|-id=154 bgcolor=#E9E9E9
| 493154 ||  || — || September 19, 2009 || Catalina || CSS || — || align=right | 2.5 km || 
|-id=155 bgcolor=#E9E9E9
| 493155 ||  || — || September 30, 2014 || Mount Lemmon || Mount Lemmon Survey || — || align=right | 2.9 km || 
|-id=156 bgcolor=#d6d6d6
| 493156 ||  || — || March 1, 2010 || WISE || WISE || — || align=right | 2.9 km || 
|-id=157 bgcolor=#E9E9E9
| 493157 ||  || — || May 1, 2012 || Mount Lemmon || Mount Lemmon Survey || — || align=right | 1.3 km || 
|-id=158 bgcolor=#d6d6d6
| 493158 ||  || — || April 28, 2012 || Mount Lemmon || Mount Lemmon Survey || — || align=right | 2.8 km || 
|-id=159 bgcolor=#d6d6d6
| 493159 ||  || — || January 31, 2006 || Kitt Peak || Spacewatch || THM || align=right | 3.2 km || 
|-id=160 bgcolor=#d6d6d6
| 493160 ||  || — || October 19, 2003 || Kitt Peak || Spacewatch || — || align=right | 2.9 km || 
|-id=161 bgcolor=#d6d6d6
| 493161 ||  || — || July 2, 2008 || Mount Lemmon || Mount Lemmon Survey || — || align=right | 2.1 km || 
|-id=162 bgcolor=#E9E9E9
| 493162 ||  || — || May 18, 2013 || Mount Lemmon || Mount Lemmon Survey || — || align=right | 1.3 km || 
|-id=163 bgcolor=#E9E9E9
| 493163 ||  || — || November 26, 2005 || Kitt Peak || Spacewatch || — || align=right | 2.3 km || 
|-id=164 bgcolor=#d6d6d6
| 493164 ||  || — || December 18, 2009 || Kitt Peak || Spacewatch || — || align=right | 2.9 km || 
|-id=165 bgcolor=#E9E9E9
| 493165 ||  || — || May 12, 2013 || Mount Lemmon || Mount Lemmon Survey || — || align=right | 1.8 km || 
|-id=166 bgcolor=#d6d6d6
| 493166 ||  || — || July 29, 2009 || Kitt Peak || Spacewatch || BRA || align=right | 1.7 km || 
|-id=167 bgcolor=#E9E9E9
| 493167 ||  || — || May 13, 2004 || Kitt Peak || Spacewatch || — || align=right | 1.6 km || 
|-id=168 bgcolor=#E9E9E9
| 493168 ||  || — || October 7, 2005 || Catalina || CSS || — || align=right | 2.0 km || 
|-id=169 bgcolor=#d6d6d6
| 493169 ||  || — || February 19, 2010 || WISE || WISE || — || align=right | 4.2 km || 
|-id=170 bgcolor=#E9E9E9
| 493170 ||  || — || May 1, 2013 || Mount Lemmon || Mount Lemmon Survey || — || align=right | 3.5 km || 
|-id=171 bgcolor=#d6d6d6
| 493171 ||  || — || October 21, 2008 || Mount Lemmon || Mount Lemmon Survey || — || align=right | 3.1 km || 
|-id=172 bgcolor=#d6d6d6
| 493172 ||  || — || September 22, 2003 || Kitt Peak || Spacewatch || — || align=right | 2.5 km || 
|-id=173 bgcolor=#E9E9E9
| 493173 ||  || — || November 27, 2010 || Mount Lemmon || Mount Lemmon Survey || — || align=right | 2.3 km || 
|-id=174 bgcolor=#d6d6d6
| 493174 ||  || — || May 15, 2012 || Mount Lemmon || Mount Lemmon Survey || — || align=right | 2.8 km || 
|-id=175 bgcolor=#d6d6d6
| 493175 ||  || — || October 3, 2014 || Mount Lemmon || Mount Lemmon Survey || — || align=right | 2.6 km || 
|-id=176 bgcolor=#d6d6d6
| 493176 ||  || — || April 27, 2012 || Haleakala || Pan-STARRS || — || align=right | 2.6 km || 
|-id=177 bgcolor=#d6d6d6
| 493177 ||  || — || October 16, 2014 || Mount Lemmon || Mount Lemmon Survey || — || align=right | 2.5 km || 
|-id=178 bgcolor=#d6d6d6
| 493178 ||  || — || December 10, 2009 || Mount Lemmon || Mount Lemmon Survey || — || align=right | 2.6 km || 
|-id=179 bgcolor=#d6d6d6
| 493179 ||  || — || January 4, 2010 || Kitt Peak || Spacewatch || — || align=right | 2.8 km || 
|-id=180 bgcolor=#d6d6d6
| 493180 ||  || — || January 18, 2010 || WISE || WISE || NAE || align=right | 2.3 km || 
|-id=181 bgcolor=#E9E9E9
| 493181 ||  || — || September 30, 2005 || Mount Lemmon || Mount Lemmon Survey || — || align=right | 2.3 km || 
|-id=182 bgcolor=#d6d6d6
| 493182 ||  || — || September 30, 2003 || Kitt Peak || Spacewatch || — || align=right | 2.4 km || 
|-id=183 bgcolor=#d6d6d6
| 493183 ||  || — || May 29, 2012 || Mount Lemmon || Mount Lemmon Survey || — || align=right | 2.9 km || 
|-id=184 bgcolor=#E9E9E9
| 493184 ||  || — || September 12, 2001 || Kitt Peak || Spacewatch || — || align=right | 1.4 km || 
|-id=185 bgcolor=#E9E9E9
| 493185 ||  || — || November 4, 2010 || Mount Lemmon || Mount Lemmon Survey || — || align=right | 1.2 km || 
|-id=186 bgcolor=#d6d6d6
| 493186 ||  || — || June 10, 2007 || Kitt Peak || Spacewatch || — || align=right | 2.9 km || 
|-id=187 bgcolor=#d6d6d6
| 493187 ||  || — || October 4, 2004 || Kitt Peak || Spacewatch || KOR || align=right | 1.2 km || 
|-id=188 bgcolor=#d6d6d6
| 493188 ||  || — || April 30, 2012 || Kitt Peak || Spacewatch || — || align=right | 2.8 km || 
|-id=189 bgcolor=#E9E9E9
| 493189 ||  || — || October 28, 2005 || Kitt Peak || Spacewatch || — || align=right | 1.9 km || 
|-id=190 bgcolor=#d6d6d6
| 493190 ||  || — || April 1, 2010 || WISE || WISE || — || align=right | 2.6 km || 
|-id=191 bgcolor=#E9E9E9
| 493191 ||  || — || April 7, 2008 || Kitt Peak || Spacewatch || — || align=right | 1.5 km || 
|-id=192 bgcolor=#d6d6d6
| 493192 ||  || — || June 10, 2012 || Mount Lemmon || Mount Lemmon Survey || — || align=right | 2.8 km || 
|-id=193 bgcolor=#d6d6d6
| 493193 ||  || — || September 24, 2008 || Mount Lemmon || Mount Lemmon Survey || — || align=right | 2.9 km || 
|-id=194 bgcolor=#fefefe
| 493194 ||  || — || August 28, 1995 || Kitt Peak || Spacewatch || — || align=right data-sort-value="0.75" | 750 m || 
|-id=195 bgcolor=#fefefe
| 493195 ||  || — || February 14, 2008 || Mount Lemmon || Mount Lemmon Survey || — || align=right data-sort-value="0.62" | 620 m || 
|-id=196 bgcolor=#d6d6d6
| 493196 ||  || — || August 20, 2008 || Kitt Peak || Spacewatch || — || align=right | 2.9 km || 
|-id=197 bgcolor=#d6d6d6
| 493197 ||  || — || October 21, 2014 || Mount Lemmon || Mount Lemmon Survey || — || align=right | 4.2 km || 
|-id=198 bgcolor=#d6d6d6
| 493198 ||  || — || April 22, 2012 || Kitt Peak || Spacewatch || — || align=right | 2.9 km || 
|-id=199 bgcolor=#E9E9E9
| 493199 ||  || — || November 1, 2005 || Mount Lemmon || Mount Lemmon Survey || — || align=right | 2.0 km || 
|-id=200 bgcolor=#d6d6d6
| 493200 ||  || — || November 11, 2009 || Mount Lemmon || Mount Lemmon Survey || — || align=right | 2.9 km || 
|}

493201–493300 

|-bgcolor=#E9E9E9
| 493201 ||  || — || April 13, 2004 || Kitt Peak || Spacewatch || — || align=right | 1.5 km || 
|-id=202 bgcolor=#d6d6d6
| 493202 ||  || — || February 20, 2006 || Kitt Peak || Spacewatch || — || align=right | 2.8 km || 
|-id=203 bgcolor=#d6d6d6
| 493203 ||  || — || April 23, 2011 || Haleakala || Pan-STARRS || — || align=right | 3.7 km || 
|-id=204 bgcolor=#d6d6d6
| 493204 ||  || — || October 3, 2014 || Mount Lemmon || Mount Lemmon Survey || — || align=right | 2.6 km || 
|-id=205 bgcolor=#E9E9E9
| 493205 ||  || — || June 19, 2013 || Haleakala || Pan-STARRS || — || align=right | 1.5 km || 
|-id=206 bgcolor=#E9E9E9
| 493206 ||  || — || March 25, 2003 || Kitt Peak || Spacewatch || GEF || align=right | 1.3 km || 
|-id=207 bgcolor=#d6d6d6
| 493207 ||  || — || October 21, 2014 || Kitt Peak || Spacewatch || — || align=right | 2.7 km || 
|-id=208 bgcolor=#d6d6d6
| 493208 ||  || — || September 21, 2009 || Mount Lemmon || Mount Lemmon Survey || — || align=right | 2.5 km || 
|-id=209 bgcolor=#E9E9E9
| 493209 ||  || — || September 24, 2014 || Mount Lemmon || Mount Lemmon Survey || — || align=right | 1.5 km || 
|-id=210 bgcolor=#d6d6d6
| 493210 ||  || — || September 23, 2008 || Mount Lemmon || Mount Lemmon Survey || THM || align=right | 2.5 km || 
|-id=211 bgcolor=#d6d6d6
| 493211 ||  || — || November 9, 2009 || Mount Lemmon || Mount Lemmon Survey || — || align=right | 3.2 km || 
|-id=212 bgcolor=#d6d6d6
| 493212 ||  || — || November 8, 2009 || Mount Lemmon || Mount Lemmon Survey || — || align=right | 3.4 km || 
|-id=213 bgcolor=#d6d6d6
| 493213 ||  || — || February 19, 2010 || WISE || WISE || — || align=right | 3.1 km || 
|-id=214 bgcolor=#d6d6d6
| 493214 ||  || — || April 27, 2012 || Haleakala || Pan-STARRS || — || align=right | 2.8 km || 
|-id=215 bgcolor=#fefefe
| 493215 ||  || — || October 16, 2003 || Socorro || LINEAR || — || align=right | 1.5 km || 
|-id=216 bgcolor=#E9E9E9
| 493216 ||  || — || November 22, 2005 || Kitt Peak || Spacewatch || AGN || align=right | 1.3 km || 
|-id=217 bgcolor=#E9E9E9
| 493217 ||  || — || December 13, 2010 || Kitt Peak || Spacewatch || AGN || align=right | 1.3 km || 
|-id=218 bgcolor=#d6d6d6
| 493218 ||  || — || April 27, 2012 || Haleakala || Pan-STARRS || — || align=right | 3.2 km || 
|-id=219 bgcolor=#d6d6d6
| 493219 ||  || — || February 4, 2011 || Haleakala || Pan-STARRS || — || align=right | 1.8 km || 
|-id=220 bgcolor=#d6d6d6
| 493220 ||  || — || October 21, 2003 || Kitt Peak || Spacewatch || — || align=right | 2.8 km || 
|-id=221 bgcolor=#d6d6d6
| 493221 ||  || — || November 18, 2003 || Kitt Peak || Spacewatch || — || align=right | 2.6 km || 
|-id=222 bgcolor=#d6d6d6
| 493222 ||  || — || October 2, 2014 || Haleakala || Pan-STARRS || — || align=right | 2.6 km || 
|-id=223 bgcolor=#d6d6d6
| 493223 ||  || — || March 1, 2010 || WISE || WISE || — || align=right | 2.7 km || 
|-id=224 bgcolor=#d6d6d6
| 493224 ||  || — || October 22, 2003 || Kitt Peak || Spacewatch || EOS || align=right | 2.4 km || 
|-id=225 bgcolor=#E9E9E9
| 493225 ||  || — || September 19, 2001 || Kitt Peak || Spacewatch || — || align=right | 1.4 km || 
|-id=226 bgcolor=#d6d6d6
| 493226 ||  || — || October 20, 2014 || Kitt Peak || Spacewatch || — || align=right | 2.8 km || 
|-id=227 bgcolor=#d6d6d6
| 493227 ||  || — || September 30, 2003 || Kitt Peak || Spacewatch || EOS || align=right | 1.7 km || 
|-id=228 bgcolor=#E9E9E9
| 493228 ||  || — || November 12, 2010 || Mount Lemmon || Mount Lemmon Survey || — || align=right | 1.8 km || 
|-id=229 bgcolor=#fefefe
| 493229 ||  || — || February 13, 2012 || Kitt Peak || Spacewatch || NYS || align=right data-sort-value="0.66" | 660 m || 
|-id=230 bgcolor=#E9E9E9
| 493230 ||  || — || October 9, 2005 || Kitt Peak || Spacewatch || — || align=right | 2.4 km || 
|-id=231 bgcolor=#fefefe
| 493231 ||  || — || December 31, 2011 || Kitt Peak || Spacewatch || NYS || align=right data-sort-value="0.49" | 490 m || 
|-id=232 bgcolor=#d6d6d6
| 493232 ||  || — || October 11, 1997 || Kitt Peak || Spacewatch || — || align=right | 3.0 km || 
|-id=233 bgcolor=#d6d6d6
| 493233 ||  || — || July 13, 2013 || Mount Lemmon || Mount Lemmon Survey || EOS || align=right | 2.3 km || 
|-id=234 bgcolor=#d6d6d6
| 493234 ||  || — || September 23, 2008 || Mount Lemmon || Mount Lemmon Survey || — || align=right | 3.4 km || 
|-id=235 bgcolor=#d6d6d6
| 493235 ||  || — || June 12, 2013 || Mount Lemmon || Mount Lemmon Survey || — || align=right | 3.7 km || 
|-id=236 bgcolor=#fefefe
| 493236 ||  || — || February 28, 2009 || Kitt Peak || Spacewatch || MAS || align=right data-sort-value="0.78" | 780 m || 
|-id=237 bgcolor=#E9E9E9
| 493237 ||  || — || November 28, 2005 || Kitt Peak || Spacewatch || — || align=right | 2.6 km || 
|-id=238 bgcolor=#E9E9E9
| 493238 ||  || — || November 1, 2005 || Mount Lemmon || Mount Lemmon Survey || — || align=right | 1.9 km || 
|-id=239 bgcolor=#d6d6d6
| 493239 ||  || — || April 29, 2010 || WISE || WISE || 7:4 || align=right | 3.4 km || 
|-id=240 bgcolor=#d6d6d6
| 493240 ||  || — || August 31, 2014 || Haleakala || Pan-STARRS || EOS || align=right | 1.9 km || 
|-id=241 bgcolor=#d6d6d6
| 493241 ||  || — || April 24, 2006 || Kitt Peak || Spacewatch || — || align=right | 3.2 km || 
|-id=242 bgcolor=#d6d6d6
| 493242 ||  || — || April 22, 2007 || Kitt Peak || Spacewatch || — || align=right | 2.8 km || 
|-id=243 bgcolor=#d6d6d6
| 493243 ||  || — || September 6, 2008 || Mount Lemmon || Mount Lemmon Survey || — || align=right | 2.8 km || 
|-id=244 bgcolor=#d6d6d6
| 493244 ||  || — || October 15, 2014 || Kitt Peak || Spacewatch || — || align=right | 2.3 km || 
|-id=245 bgcolor=#d6d6d6
| 493245 ||  || — || August 31, 2014 || Haleakala || Pan-STARRS || — || align=right | 2.9 km || 
|-id=246 bgcolor=#d6d6d6
| 493246 ||  || — || August 31, 2014 || Haleakala || Pan-STARRS || — || align=right | 2.4 km || 
|-id=247 bgcolor=#E9E9E9
| 493247 ||  || — || April 4, 2008 || Mount Lemmon || Mount Lemmon Survey || — || align=right | 1.7 km || 
|-id=248 bgcolor=#d6d6d6
| 493248 ||  || — || June 14, 2007 || Kitt Peak || Spacewatch || — || align=right | 3.2 km || 
|-id=249 bgcolor=#E9E9E9
| 493249 ||  || — || October 8, 2005 || Kitt Peak || Spacewatch || — || align=right | 1.7 km || 
|-id=250 bgcolor=#E9E9E9
| 493250 ||  || — || March 30, 2012 || Mount Lemmon || Mount Lemmon Survey || — || align=right | 2.0 km || 
|-id=251 bgcolor=#E9E9E9
| 493251 ||  || — || October 1, 2005 || Mount Lemmon || Mount Lemmon Survey || — || align=right | 2.3 km || 
|-id=252 bgcolor=#d6d6d6
| 493252 ||  || — || January 30, 2011 || Haleakala || Pan-STARRS || — || align=right | 2.5 km || 
|-id=253 bgcolor=#d6d6d6
| 493253 ||  || — || September 28, 2008 || Mount Lemmon || Mount Lemmon Survey || — || align=right | 2.7 km || 
|-id=254 bgcolor=#fefefe
| 493254 ||  || — || November 13, 2007 || Kitt Peak || Spacewatch || — || align=right data-sort-value="0.57" | 570 m || 
|-id=255 bgcolor=#E9E9E9
| 493255 ||  || — || November 30, 2005 || Mount Lemmon || Mount Lemmon Survey || AGN || align=right | 1.2 km || 
|-id=256 bgcolor=#fefefe
| 493256 ||  || — || October 20, 2003 || Kitt Peak || Spacewatch || — || align=right data-sort-value="0.85" | 850 m || 
|-id=257 bgcolor=#d6d6d6
| 493257 ||  || — || July 28, 2013 || Haleakala || Pan-STARRS || VER || align=right | 2.8 km || 
|-id=258 bgcolor=#E9E9E9
| 493258 ||  || — || October 30, 2005 || Catalina || CSS || — || align=right | 2.5 km || 
|-id=259 bgcolor=#d6d6d6
| 493259 ||  || — || November 9, 2009 || Kitt Peak || Spacewatch || — || align=right | 3.4 km || 
|-id=260 bgcolor=#E9E9E9
| 493260 ||  || — || July 5, 2014 || Haleakala || Pan-STARRS || — || align=right | 2.7 km || 
|-id=261 bgcolor=#d6d6d6
| 493261 ||  || — || October 22, 2014 || Kitt Peak || Spacewatch || — || align=right | 2.3 km || 
|-id=262 bgcolor=#d6d6d6
| 493262 ||  || — || August 31, 2014 || Haleakala || Pan-STARRS || EOS || align=right | 1.9 km || 
|-id=263 bgcolor=#d6d6d6
| 493263 ||  || — || February 15, 2010 || WISE || WISE || — || align=right | 3.4 km || 
|-id=264 bgcolor=#E9E9E9
| 493264 ||  || — || December 2, 2010 || Kitt Peak || Spacewatch || PAD || align=right | 2.0 km || 
|-id=265 bgcolor=#E9E9E9
| 493265 ||  || — || February 25, 2012 || Mount Lemmon || Mount Lemmon Survey || — || align=right | 2.5 km || 
|-id=266 bgcolor=#E9E9E9
| 493266 ||  || — || December 4, 2005 || Mount Lemmon || Mount Lemmon Survey || — || align=right | 1.6 km || 
|-id=267 bgcolor=#d6d6d6
| 493267 ||  || — || September 19, 2003 || Campo Imperatore || CINEOS || EOS || align=right | 1.9 km || 
|-id=268 bgcolor=#d6d6d6
| 493268 ||  || — || April 15, 2012 || Haleakala || Pan-STARRS || EOS || align=right | 1.9 km || 
|-id=269 bgcolor=#d6d6d6
| 493269 ||  || — || November 8, 2009 || Mount Lemmon || Mount Lemmon Survey || — || align=right | 2.4 km || 
|-id=270 bgcolor=#E9E9E9
| 493270 ||  || — || October 22, 2005 || Kitt Peak || Spacewatch || GEF || align=right | 1.1 km || 
|-id=271 bgcolor=#d6d6d6
| 493271 ||  || — || October 3, 2014 || Mount Lemmon || Mount Lemmon Survey || — || align=right | 2.6 km || 
|-id=272 bgcolor=#d6d6d6
| 493272 ||  || — || October 3, 2014 || Mount Lemmon || Mount Lemmon Survey || — || align=right | 3.0 km || 
|-id=273 bgcolor=#fefefe
| 493273 ||  || — || November 2, 2007 || Kitt Peak || Spacewatch || — || align=right data-sort-value="0.50" | 500 m || 
|-id=274 bgcolor=#d6d6d6
| 493274 ||  || — || August 21, 2008 || Kitt Peak || Spacewatch || — || align=right | 2.7 km || 
|-id=275 bgcolor=#d6d6d6
| 493275 ||  || — || September 27, 2008 || Mount Lemmon || Mount Lemmon Survey || — || align=right | 3.4 km || 
|-id=276 bgcolor=#d6d6d6
| 493276 ||  || — || April 2, 2011 || Mount Lemmon || Mount Lemmon Survey || — || align=right | 2.2 km || 
|-id=277 bgcolor=#d6d6d6
| 493277 ||  || — || April 12, 2012 || Haleakala || Pan-STARRS || — || align=right | 2.5 km || 
|-id=278 bgcolor=#E9E9E9
| 493278 ||  || — || December 15, 2006 || Kitt Peak || Spacewatch || — || align=right data-sort-value="0.78" | 780 m || 
|-id=279 bgcolor=#E9E9E9
| 493279 ||  || — || April 6, 2008 || Kitt Peak || Spacewatch || AGN || align=right | 1.2 km || 
|-id=280 bgcolor=#d6d6d6
| 493280 ||  || — || March 29, 2012 || Haleakala || Pan-STARRS || — || align=right | 2.4 km || 
|-id=281 bgcolor=#E9E9E9
| 493281 ||  || — || August 18, 2009 || La Sagra || OAM Obs. || GEF || align=right | 1.4 km || 
|-id=282 bgcolor=#d6d6d6
| 493282 ||  || — || March 28, 2012 || Kitt Peak || Spacewatch || — || align=right | 3.0 km || 
|-id=283 bgcolor=#d6d6d6
| 493283 ||  || — || April 27, 2012 || Haleakala || Pan-STARRS || — || align=right | 2.4 km || 
|-id=284 bgcolor=#E9E9E9
| 493284 ||  || — || November 2, 2010 || Kitt Peak || Spacewatch || (5) || align=right data-sort-value="0.92" | 920 m || 
|-id=285 bgcolor=#d6d6d6
| 493285 ||  || — || September 21, 2003 || Kitt Peak || Spacewatch || — || align=right | 2.7 km || 
|-id=286 bgcolor=#d6d6d6
| 493286 ||  || — || October 16, 2014 || Kitt Peak || Spacewatch || — || align=right | 3.1 km || 
|-id=287 bgcolor=#d6d6d6
| 493287 ||  || — || July 29, 2008 || Kitt Peak || Spacewatch || EOS || align=right | 1.7 km || 
|-id=288 bgcolor=#d6d6d6
| 493288 ||  || — || August 30, 2014 || Haleakala || Pan-STARRS || — || align=right | 2.8 km || 
|-id=289 bgcolor=#d6d6d6
| 493289 ||  || — || July 16, 2013 || Haleakala || Pan-STARRS || — || align=right | 2.5 km || 
|-id=290 bgcolor=#E9E9E9
| 493290 ||  || — || July 1, 2013 || Haleakala || Pan-STARRS || — || align=right | 2.6 km || 
|-id=291 bgcolor=#E9E9E9
| 493291 ||  || — || October 28, 2014 || Mount Lemmon || Mount Lemmon Survey || EUN || align=right | 1.2 km || 
|-id=292 bgcolor=#E9E9E9
| 493292 ||  || — || September 16, 2009 || Catalina || CSS || — || align=right | 2.9 km || 
|-id=293 bgcolor=#d6d6d6
| 493293 ||  || — || October 28, 2014 || Haleakala || Pan-STARRS || — || align=right | 2.5 km || 
|-id=294 bgcolor=#d6d6d6
| 493294 ||  || — || October 21, 2008 || Mount Lemmon || Mount Lemmon Survey || — || align=right | 2.6 km || 
|-id=295 bgcolor=#E9E9E9
| 493295 ||  || — || March 31, 2003 || Kitt Peak || Spacewatch || — || align=right | 2.6 km || 
|-id=296 bgcolor=#E9E9E9
| 493296 ||  || — || December 1, 2005 || Mount Lemmon || Mount Lemmon Survey || AEO || align=right | 1.3 km || 
|-id=297 bgcolor=#E9E9E9
| 493297 ||  || — || October 25, 2005 || Mount Lemmon || Mount Lemmon Survey || AGN || align=right | 1.1 km || 
|-id=298 bgcolor=#E9E9E9
| 493298 ||  || — || November 10, 2010 || Kitt Peak || Spacewatch || — || align=right | 1.0 km || 
|-id=299 bgcolor=#d6d6d6
| 493299 ||  || — || August 31, 2014 || Haleakala || Pan-STARRS || VER || align=right | 2.7 km || 
|-id=300 bgcolor=#fefefe
| 493300 ||  || — || May 12, 2010 || WISE || WISE || — || align=right data-sort-value="0.94" | 940 m || 
|}

493301–493400 

|-bgcolor=#d6d6d6
| 493301 ||  || — || March 1, 2010 || WISE || WISE || — || align=right | 4.1 km || 
|-id=302 bgcolor=#E9E9E9
| 493302 ||  || — || November 1, 2005 || Kitt Peak || Spacewatch || — || align=right | 2.2 km || 
|-id=303 bgcolor=#d6d6d6
| 493303 ||  || — || October 14, 2014 || Kitt Peak || Spacewatch || — || align=right | 2.9 km || 
|-id=304 bgcolor=#d6d6d6
| 493304 ||  || — || September 15, 2009 || Kitt Peak || Spacewatch || KOR || align=right | 1.4 km || 
|-id=305 bgcolor=#d6d6d6
| 493305 ||  || — || March 1, 2010 || WISE || WISE || — || align=right | 3.9 km || 
|-id=306 bgcolor=#d6d6d6
| 493306 ||  || — || January 31, 2010 || WISE || WISE || — || align=right | 3.8 km || 
|-id=307 bgcolor=#E9E9E9
| 493307 ||  || — || September 3, 2014 || Mount Lemmon || Mount Lemmon Survey || (5) || align=right data-sort-value="0.87" | 870 m || 
|-id=308 bgcolor=#fefefe
| 493308 ||  || — || December 31, 2008 || Kitt Peak || Spacewatch || — || align=right data-sort-value="0.51" | 510 m || 
|-id=309 bgcolor=#d6d6d6
| 493309 ||  || — || March 29, 2011 || Mount Lemmon || Mount Lemmon Survey || — || align=right | 2.9 km || 
|-id=310 bgcolor=#d6d6d6
| 493310 ||  || — || November 16, 2009 || Mount Lemmon || Mount Lemmon Survey || KOR || align=right | 1.4 km || 
|-id=311 bgcolor=#E9E9E9
| 493311 ||  || — || November 17, 2006 || Mount Lemmon || Mount Lemmon Survey || — || align=right data-sort-value="0.94" | 940 m || 
|-id=312 bgcolor=#d6d6d6
| 493312 ||  || — || May 15, 2012 || Haleakala || Pan-STARRS || EOS || align=right | 2.0 km || 
|-id=313 bgcolor=#d6d6d6
| 493313 ||  || — || April 2, 2011 || Mount Lemmon || Mount Lemmon Survey || — || align=right | 3.4 km || 
|-id=314 bgcolor=#fefefe
| 493314 ||  || — || December 22, 2008 || Kitt Peak || Spacewatch || — || align=right data-sort-value="0.76" | 760 m || 
|-id=315 bgcolor=#d6d6d6
| 493315 ||  || — || December 17, 2009 || Mount Lemmon || Mount Lemmon Survey || — || align=right | 3.0 km || 
|-id=316 bgcolor=#d6d6d6
| 493316 ||  || — || November 17, 2009 || Mount Lemmon || Mount Lemmon Survey || — || align=right | 2.8 km || 
|-id=317 bgcolor=#E9E9E9
| 493317 ||  || — || September 25, 2014 || Kitt Peak || Spacewatch || — || align=right | 1.6 km || 
|-id=318 bgcolor=#d6d6d6
| 493318 ||  || — || February 27, 2006 || Kitt Peak || Spacewatch || — || align=right | 3.1 km || 
|-id=319 bgcolor=#E9E9E9
| 493319 ||  || — || December 14, 2010 || Mount Lemmon || Mount Lemmon Survey || — || align=right | 2.1 km || 
|-id=320 bgcolor=#E9E9E9
| 493320 ||  || — || May 29, 2008 || Mount Lemmon || Mount Lemmon Survey || — || align=right | 2.4 km || 
|-id=321 bgcolor=#d6d6d6
| 493321 ||  || — || September 23, 2008 || Mount Lemmon || Mount Lemmon Survey || — || align=right | 3.0 km || 
|-id=322 bgcolor=#E9E9E9
| 493322 ||  || — || October 18, 2014 || Kitt Peak || Spacewatch || — || align=right | 2.4 km || 
|-id=323 bgcolor=#E9E9E9
| 493323 ||  || — || April 8, 2008 || Kitt Peak || Spacewatch || — || align=right | 2.1 km || 
|-id=324 bgcolor=#d6d6d6
| 493324 ||  || — || December 20, 2009 || Kitt Peak || Spacewatch || HYG || align=right | 2.9 km || 
|-id=325 bgcolor=#d6d6d6
| 493325 ||  || — || June 30, 2013 || Haleakala || Pan-STARRS || — || align=right | 2.4 km || 
|-id=326 bgcolor=#E9E9E9
| 493326 ||  || — || December 14, 2010 || Mount Lemmon || Mount Lemmon Survey || EUN || align=right | 1.4 km || 
|-id=327 bgcolor=#d6d6d6
| 493327 ||  || — || April 28, 2012 || Mount Lemmon || Mount Lemmon Survey || — || align=right | 4.1 km || 
|-id=328 bgcolor=#E9E9E9
| 493328 ||  || — || June 15, 2004 || Kitt Peak || Spacewatch || — || align=right | 2.2 km || 
|-id=329 bgcolor=#E9E9E9
| 493329 ||  || — || September 26, 2000 || Socorro || LINEAR || DOR || align=right | 2.8 km || 
|-id=330 bgcolor=#E9E9E9
| 493330 ||  || — || October 3, 2010 || Catalina || CSS || (5) || align=right data-sort-value="0.83" | 830 m || 
|-id=331 bgcolor=#d6d6d6
| 493331 ||  || — || April 28, 2012 || Mount Lemmon || Mount Lemmon Survey || — || align=right | 3.2 km || 
|-id=332 bgcolor=#d6d6d6
| 493332 ||  || — || March 9, 2011 || Mount Lemmon || Mount Lemmon Survey || — || align=right | 2.8 km || 
|-id=333 bgcolor=#d6d6d6
| 493333 ||  || — || April 18, 2010 || WISE || WISE || — || align=right | 3.9 km || 
|-id=334 bgcolor=#d6d6d6
| 493334 ||  || — || April 20, 2010 || WISE || WISE || Tj (2.99) || align=right | 3.5 km || 
|-id=335 bgcolor=#d6d6d6
| 493335 ||  || — || August 30, 2014 || Haleakala || Pan-STARRS || — || align=right | 2.4 km || 
|-id=336 bgcolor=#d6d6d6
| 493336 ||  || — || April 1, 2012 || Mount Lemmon || Mount Lemmon Survey || — || align=right | 3.7 km || 
|-id=337 bgcolor=#d6d6d6
| 493337 ||  || — || January 22, 2006 || Mount Lemmon || Mount Lemmon Survey || KOR || align=right | 1.3 km || 
|-id=338 bgcolor=#E9E9E9
| 493338 ||  || — || February 24, 2012 || Kitt Peak || Spacewatch || — || align=right | 2.2 km || 
|-id=339 bgcolor=#d6d6d6
| 493339 ||  || — || March 31, 2011 || Haleakala || Pan-STARRS || EOS || align=right | 2.1 km || 
|-id=340 bgcolor=#d6d6d6
| 493340 ||  || — || March 8, 2010 || WISE || WISE || EOS || align=right | 2.8 km || 
|-id=341 bgcolor=#d6d6d6
| 493341 ||  || — || April 1, 2010 || WISE || WISE || — || align=right | 3.4 km || 
|-id=342 bgcolor=#d6d6d6
| 493342 ||  || — || March 26, 2011 || Kitt Peak || Spacewatch || — || align=right | 2.6 km || 
|-id=343 bgcolor=#E9E9E9
| 493343 ||  || — || April 28, 2009 || Mount Lemmon || Mount Lemmon Survey || — || align=right data-sort-value="0.86" | 860 m || 
|-id=344 bgcolor=#d6d6d6
| 493344 ||  || — || April 27, 2012 || Haleakala || Pan-STARRS || — || align=right | 2.7 km || 
|-id=345 bgcolor=#d6d6d6
| 493345 ||  || — || September 26, 2008 || Mount Lemmon || Mount Lemmon Survey || — || align=right | 2.2 km || 
|-id=346 bgcolor=#d6d6d6
| 493346 ||  || — || August 31, 2014 || Haleakala || Pan-STARRS || EOS || align=right | 2.4 km || 
|-id=347 bgcolor=#E9E9E9
| 493347 ||  || — || March 5, 2008 || Mount Lemmon || Mount Lemmon Survey || — || align=right | 1.2 km || 
|-id=348 bgcolor=#E9E9E9
| 493348 ||  || — || November 8, 2010 || Kitt Peak || Spacewatch || — || align=right | 1.8 km || 
|-id=349 bgcolor=#E9E9E9
| 493349 ||  || — || April 13, 2013 || Haleakala || Pan-STARRS || — || align=right | 1.5 km || 
|-id=350 bgcolor=#d6d6d6
| 493350 ||  || — || October 22, 2014 || Kitt Peak || Spacewatch || — || align=right | 2.5 km || 
|-id=351 bgcolor=#E9E9E9
| 493351 ||  || — || October 5, 2005 || Catalina || CSS || — || align=right | 1.6 km || 
|-id=352 bgcolor=#d6d6d6
| 493352 ||  || — || January 16, 2011 || Mount Lemmon || Mount Lemmon Survey || EOS || align=right | 2.0 km || 
|-id=353 bgcolor=#d6d6d6
| 493353 ||  || — || March 6, 2010 || WISE || WISE || — || align=right | 3.7 km || 
|-id=354 bgcolor=#d6d6d6
| 493354 ||  || — || October 22, 2008 || Kitt Peak || Spacewatch || — || align=right | 3.1 km || 
|-id=355 bgcolor=#E9E9E9
| 493355 ||  || — || August 31, 2005 || Kitt Peak || Spacewatch || — || align=right | 1.3 km || 
|-id=356 bgcolor=#d6d6d6
| 493356 ||  || — || September 24, 2008 || Mount Lemmon || Mount Lemmon Survey || VER || align=right | 2.6 km || 
|-id=357 bgcolor=#E9E9E9
| 493357 ||  || — || October 25, 2005 || Mount Lemmon || Mount Lemmon Survey || — || align=right | 1.6 km || 
|-id=358 bgcolor=#d6d6d6
| 493358 ||  || — || January 23, 2006 || Mount Lemmon || Mount Lemmon Survey || — || align=right | 2.1 km || 
|-id=359 bgcolor=#d6d6d6
| 493359 ||  || — || November 17, 2014 || Haleakala || Pan-STARRS || — || align=right | 2.6 km || 
|-id=360 bgcolor=#d6d6d6
| 493360 ||  || — || October 5, 2013 || Mount Lemmon || Mount Lemmon Survey || — || align=right | 2.9 km || 
|-id=361 bgcolor=#E9E9E9
| 493361 ||  || — || July 9, 2013 || Haleakala || Pan-STARRS || — || align=right | 2.6 km || 
|-id=362 bgcolor=#E9E9E9
| 493362 ||  || — || April 26, 2008 || Mount Lemmon || Mount Lemmon Survey || AEO || align=right | 1.1 km || 
|-id=363 bgcolor=#d6d6d6
| 493363 ||  || — || September 24, 2014 || Kitt Peak || Spacewatch || — || align=right | 2.4 km || 
|-id=364 bgcolor=#d6d6d6
| 493364 ||  || — || August 31, 2014 || Haleakala || Pan-STARRS || — || align=right | 2.7 km || 
|-id=365 bgcolor=#E9E9E9
| 493365 ||  || — || May 2, 2013 || Haleakala || Pan-STARRS || — || align=right | 1.5 km || 
|-id=366 bgcolor=#d6d6d6
| 493366 ||  || — || September 22, 2008 || Kitt Peak || Spacewatch || — || align=right | 2.6 km || 
|-id=367 bgcolor=#d6d6d6
| 493367 ||  || — || January 4, 2010 || Kitt Peak || Spacewatch || — || align=right | 4.1 km || 
|-id=368 bgcolor=#E9E9E9
| 493368 ||  || — || May 2, 2008 || Kitt Peak || Spacewatch || — || align=right | 1.5 km || 
|-id=369 bgcolor=#d6d6d6
| 493369 ||  || — || May 21, 2012 || Haleakala || Pan-STARRS || EOS || align=right | 2.4 km || 
|-id=370 bgcolor=#E9E9E9
| 493370 ||  || — || August 15, 2009 || Kitt Peak || Spacewatch || — || align=right | 1.3 km || 
|-id=371 bgcolor=#d6d6d6
| 493371 ||  || — || July 14, 2013 || Haleakala || Pan-STARRS || — || align=right | 2.2 km || 
|-id=372 bgcolor=#d6d6d6
| 493372 ||  || — || March 15, 2011 || Haleakala || Pan-STARRS || EOS || align=right | 1.8 km || 
|-id=373 bgcolor=#d6d6d6
| 493373 ||  || — || March 23, 2012 || Kitt Peak || Spacewatch || EOS || align=right | 1.9 km || 
|-id=374 bgcolor=#d6d6d6
| 493374 ||  || — || August 20, 2009 || Kitt Peak || Spacewatch || KOR || align=right | 1.2 km || 
|-id=375 bgcolor=#E9E9E9
| 493375 ||  || — || April 15, 2013 || Haleakala || Pan-STARRS || — || align=right | 1.1 km || 
|-id=376 bgcolor=#d6d6d6
| 493376 ||  || — || November 19, 2009 || Mount Lemmon || Mount Lemmon Survey || — || align=right | 2.7 km || 
|-id=377 bgcolor=#d6d6d6
| 493377 ||  || — || September 23, 2014 || Mount Lemmon || Mount Lemmon Survey || — || align=right | 2.8 km || 
|-id=378 bgcolor=#fefefe
| 493378 ||  || — || October 18, 2007 || Kitt Peak || Spacewatch || — || align=right data-sort-value="0.54" | 540 m || 
|-id=379 bgcolor=#d6d6d6
| 493379 ||  || — || November 21, 2009 || Mount Lemmon || Mount Lemmon Survey || — || align=right | 3.3 km || 
|-id=380 bgcolor=#d6d6d6
| 493380 ||  || — || February 21, 2010 || WISE || WISE || — || align=right | 4.2 km || 
|-id=381 bgcolor=#E9E9E9
| 493381 ||  || — || April 20, 2012 || Mount Lemmon || Mount Lemmon Survey || — || align=right | 2.8 km || 
|-id=382 bgcolor=#d6d6d6
| 493382 ||  || — || February 5, 2011 || Haleakala || Pan-STARRS || — || align=right | 2.2 km || 
|-id=383 bgcolor=#fefefe
| 493383 ||  || — || August 22, 2007 || Kitt Peak || Spacewatch || — || align=right data-sort-value="0.90" | 900 m || 
|-id=384 bgcolor=#E9E9E9
| 493384 ||  || — || November 20, 2006 || Kitt Peak || Spacewatch || — || align=right | 1.1 km || 
|-id=385 bgcolor=#E9E9E9
| 493385 ||  || — || January 23, 2011 || Mount Lemmon || Mount Lemmon Survey || — || align=right | 2.1 km || 
|-id=386 bgcolor=#d6d6d6
| 493386 ||  || — || April 30, 2012 || Kitt Peak || Spacewatch || — || align=right | 2.9 km || 
|-id=387 bgcolor=#E9E9E9
| 493387 ||  || — || November 5, 2010 || Kitt Peak || Spacewatch || — || align=right data-sort-value="0.88" | 880 m || 
|-id=388 bgcolor=#d6d6d6
| 493388 ||  || — || May 10, 2012 || Siding Spring || SSS || — || align=right | 3.7 km || 
|-id=389 bgcolor=#d6d6d6
| 493389 ||  || — || April 19, 2007 || Mount Lemmon || Mount Lemmon Survey || — || align=right | 2.4 km || 
|-id=390 bgcolor=#d6d6d6
| 493390 ||  || — || September 4, 2008 || Kitt Peak || Spacewatch || — || align=right | 2.1 km || 
|-id=391 bgcolor=#d6d6d6
| 493391 ||  || — || October 2, 2014 || Haleakala || Pan-STARRS || — || align=right | 2.8 km || 
|-id=392 bgcolor=#d6d6d6
| 493392 ||  || — || September 3, 2008 || Kitt Peak || Spacewatch || VER || align=right | 2.4 km || 
|-id=393 bgcolor=#fefefe
| 493393 ||  || — || March 12, 2005 || Kitt Peak || Spacewatch || V || align=right data-sort-value="0.60" | 600 m || 
|-id=394 bgcolor=#d6d6d6
| 493394 ||  || — || October 25, 2014 || Haleakala || Pan-STARRS || — || align=right | 3.2 km || 
|-id=395 bgcolor=#E9E9E9
| 493395 ||  || — || February 27, 2007 || Kitt Peak || Spacewatch || — || align=right | 1.8 km || 
|-id=396 bgcolor=#E9E9E9
| 493396 ||  || — || October 11, 1977 || Palomar || PLS || (5) || align=right | 1.0 km || 
|-id=397 bgcolor=#E9E9E9
| 493397 ||  || — || July 1, 2013 || Haleakala || Pan-STARRS || — || align=right | 2.1 km || 
|-id=398 bgcolor=#d6d6d6
| 493398 ||  || — || April 25, 2007 || Kitt Peak || Spacewatch || EMA || align=right | 4.2 km || 
|-id=399 bgcolor=#E9E9E9
| 493399 ||  || — || December 21, 2006 || Kitt Peak || Spacewatch || — || align=right | 2.0 km || 
|-id=400 bgcolor=#d6d6d6
| 493400 ||  || — || November 16, 2009 || Kitt Peak || Spacewatch || VER || align=right | 3.5 km || 
|}

493401–493500 

|-bgcolor=#E9E9E9
| 493401 ||  || — || September 3, 2010 || Mount Lemmon || Mount Lemmon Survey || MAR || align=right data-sort-value="0.95" | 950 m || 
|-id=402 bgcolor=#d6d6d6
| 493402 ||  || — || September 4, 2014 || Haleakala || Pan-STARRS || — || align=right | 2.5 km || 
|-id=403 bgcolor=#d6d6d6
| 493403 ||  || — || July 29, 2008 || Mount Lemmon || Mount Lemmon Survey || NAE || align=right | 2.2 km || 
|-id=404 bgcolor=#d6d6d6
| 493404 ||  || — || September 20, 2014 || Haleakala || Pan-STARRS || — || align=right | 3.2 km || 
|-id=405 bgcolor=#d6d6d6
| 493405 ||  || — || April 30, 2000 || Anderson Mesa || LONEOS || Tj (2.99) || align=right | 4.7 km || 
|-id=406 bgcolor=#d6d6d6
| 493406 ||  || — || September 24, 2008 || Kitt Peak || Spacewatch || — || align=right | 2.8 km || 
|-id=407 bgcolor=#d6d6d6
| 493407 ||  || — || November 20, 2014 || Haleakala || Pan-STARRS || — || align=right | 3.9 km || 
|-id=408 bgcolor=#E9E9E9
| 493408 ||  || — || October 29, 2014 || Haleakala || Pan-STARRS || — || align=right | 1.7 km || 
|-id=409 bgcolor=#d6d6d6
| 493409 ||  || — || June 13, 2012 || Haleakala || Pan-STARRS || — || align=right | 2.5 km || 
|-id=410 bgcolor=#d6d6d6
| 493410 ||  || — || March 27, 2011 || Mount Lemmon || Mount Lemmon Survey || — || align=right | 2.9 km || 
|-id=411 bgcolor=#E9E9E9
| 493411 ||  || — || June 10, 2013 || Mount Lemmon || Mount Lemmon Survey || — || align=right | 2.8 km || 
|-id=412 bgcolor=#E9E9E9
| 493412 ||  || — || March 28, 2008 || Mount Lemmon || Mount Lemmon Survey || — || align=right | 1.3 km || 
|-id=413 bgcolor=#d6d6d6
| 493413 ||  || — || February 15, 2010 || WISE || WISE || — || align=right | 3.9 km || 
|-id=414 bgcolor=#d6d6d6
| 493414 ||  || — || October 29, 2014 || Catalina || CSS || — || align=right | 3.2 km || 
|-id=415 bgcolor=#d6d6d6
| 493415 ||  || — || April 27, 2012 || Haleakala || Pan-STARRS || — || align=right | 3.0 km || 
|-id=416 bgcolor=#d6d6d6
| 493416 ||  || — || September 29, 2008 || Mount Lemmon || Mount Lemmon Survey || — || align=right | 2.8 km || 
|-id=417 bgcolor=#d6d6d6
| 493417 ||  || — || April 27, 2012 || Haleakala || Pan-STARRS || — || align=right | 1.9 km || 
|-id=418 bgcolor=#d6d6d6
| 493418 ||  || — || March 31, 2011 || Haleakala || Pan-STARRS || — || align=right | 3.1 km || 
|-id=419 bgcolor=#d6d6d6
| 493419 ||  || — || September 23, 2008 || Catalina || CSS || — || align=right | 3.0 km || 
|-id=420 bgcolor=#d6d6d6
| 493420 ||  || — || November 21, 2009 || Catalina || CSS || — || align=right | 3.4 km || 
|-id=421 bgcolor=#d6d6d6
| 493421 ||  || — || May 2, 2006 || Kitt Peak || Spacewatch || Tj (2.92) || align=right | 4.1 km || 
|-id=422 bgcolor=#d6d6d6
| 493422 ||  || — || October 1, 2008 || Kitt Peak || Spacewatch || — || align=right | 3.0 km || 
|-id=423 bgcolor=#d6d6d6
| 493423 ||  || — || April 25, 2011 || Mount Lemmon || Mount Lemmon Survey || — || align=right | 2.8 km || 
|-id=424 bgcolor=#d6d6d6
| 493424 ||  || — || August 4, 2013 || Haleakala || Pan-STARRS || — || align=right | 2.5 km || 
|-id=425 bgcolor=#d6d6d6
| 493425 ||  || — || February 4, 2011 || Haleakala || Pan-STARRS || — || align=right | 2.7 km || 
|-id=426 bgcolor=#d6d6d6
| 493426 ||  || — || December 18, 2009 || Mount Lemmon || Mount Lemmon Survey || EOS || align=right | 2.3 km || 
|-id=427 bgcolor=#E9E9E9
| 493427 ||  || — || September 25, 2001 || Anderson Mesa || LONEOS || MAR || align=right | 1.5 km || 
|-id=428 bgcolor=#d6d6d6
| 493428 ||  || — || November 21, 2014 || Haleakala || Pan-STARRS || — || align=right | 2.8 km || 
|-id=429 bgcolor=#E9E9E9
| 493429 ||  || — || October 2, 2014 || Haleakala || Pan-STARRS || — || align=right | 3.1 km || 
|-id=430 bgcolor=#d6d6d6
| 493430 ||  || — || September 16, 2014 || Haleakala || Pan-STARRS || — || align=right | 3.4 km || 
|-id=431 bgcolor=#d6d6d6
| 493431 ||  || — || January 27, 2010 || WISE || WISE || NAE || align=right | 3.1 km || 
|-id=432 bgcolor=#d6d6d6
| 493432 ||  || — || March 12, 2010 || WISE || WISE || — || align=right | 4.7 km || 
|-id=433 bgcolor=#d6d6d6
| 493433 ||  || — || September 4, 2008 || Kitt Peak || Spacewatch || EOS || align=right | 1.6 km || 
|-id=434 bgcolor=#d6d6d6
| 493434 ||  || — || January 30, 2011 || Haleakala || Pan-STARRS || — || align=right | 2.3 km || 
|-id=435 bgcolor=#d6d6d6
| 493435 ||  || — || May 10, 2007 || Mount Lemmon || Mount Lemmon Survey || EOS || align=right | 1.8 km || 
|-id=436 bgcolor=#E9E9E9
| 493436 ||  || — || May 6, 2008 || Mount Lemmon || Mount Lemmon Survey || — || align=right | 2.8 km || 
|-id=437 bgcolor=#d6d6d6
| 493437 ||  || — || April 29, 2010 || WISE || WISE || — || align=right | 3.1 km || 
|-id=438 bgcolor=#d6d6d6
| 493438 ||  || — || October 7, 2008 || Mount Lemmon || Mount Lemmon Survey || — || align=right | 2.6 km || 
|-id=439 bgcolor=#d6d6d6
| 493439 ||  || — || June 18, 2013 || Haleakala || Pan-STARRS || — || align=right | 3.0 km || 
|-id=440 bgcolor=#E9E9E9
| 493440 ||  || — || July 29, 2009 || Catalina || CSS || EUN || align=right | 1.5 km || 
|-id=441 bgcolor=#d6d6d6
| 493441 ||  || — || February 5, 2010 || WISE || WISE || — || align=right | 2.7 km || 
|-id=442 bgcolor=#d6d6d6
| 493442 ||  || — || July 15, 2013 || Haleakala || Pan-STARRS || — || align=right | 2.4 km || 
|-id=443 bgcolor=#d6d6d6
| 493443 ||  || — || March 11, 2005 || Mount Lemmon || Mount Lemmon Survey || — || align=right | 3.0 km || 
|-id=444 bgcolor=#d6d6d6
| 493444 ||  || — || August 12, 2013 || Haleakala || Pan-STARRS || EOS || align=right | 1.8 km || 
|-id=445 bgcolor=#d6d6d6
| 493445 ||  || — || September 29, 2008 || Mount Lemmon || Mount Lemmon Survey || — || align=right | 3.2 km || 
|-id=446 bgcolor=#d6d6d6
| 493446 ||  || — || May 25, 2006 || Mauna Kea || P. A. Wiegert || — || align=right | 2.8 km || 
|-id=447 bgcolor=#C2FFFF
| 493447 ||  || — || March 24, 2010 || WISE || WISE || L5 || align=right | 12 km || 
|-id=448 bgcolor=#d6d6d6
| 493448 ||  || — || March 24, 2006 || Mount Lemmon || Mount Lemmon Survey || — || align=right | 2.7 km || 
|-id=449 bgcolor=#d6d6d6
| 493449 ||  || — || October 16, 2009 || Mount Lemmon || Mount Lemmon Survey || — || align=right | 2.2 km || 
|-id=450 bgcolor=#E9E9E9
| 493450 ||  || — || November 8, 2010 || Mount Lemmon || Mount Lemmon Survey || EUN || align=right | 1.5 km || 
|-id=451 bgcolor=#E9E9E9
| 493451 ||  || — || September 4, 2014 || Haleakala || Pan-STARRS || — || align=right | 2.2 km || 
|-id=452 bgcolor=#d6d6d6
| 493452 ||  || — || April 25, 2011 || Mount Lemmon || Mount Lemmon Survey || — || align=right | 2.9 km || 
|-id=453 bgcolor=#E9E9E9
| 493453 ||  || — || October 2, 2014 || Haleakala || Pan-STARRS || — || align=right | 3.2 km || 
|-id=454 bgcolor=#d6d6d6
| 493454 ||  || — || October 27, 2008 || Catalina || CSS || — || align=right | 3.8 km || 
|-id=455 bgcolor=#E9E9E9
| 493455 ||  || — || August 27, 2005 || Siding Spring || SSS || — || align=right | 2.0 km || 
|-id=456 bgcolor=#E9E9E9
| 493456 ||  || — || September 23, 2009 || Mount Lemmon || Mount Lemmon Survey || GEF || align=right | 1.2 km || 
|-id=457 bgcolor=#d6d6d6
| 493457 ||  || — || March 15, 2011 || Haleakala || Pan-STARRS || — || align=right | 3.5 km || 
|-id=458 bgcolor=#d6d6d6
| 493458 ||  || — || April 19, 2006 || Kitt Peak || Spacewatch || EOS || align=right | 1.9 km || 
|-id=459 bgcolor=#d6d6d6
| 493459 ||  || — || September 7, 2008 || Mount Lemmon || Mount Lemmon Survey || EOS || align=right | 2.3 km || 
|-id=460 bgcolor=#d6d6d6
| 493460 ||  || — || August 30, 2008 || Socorro || LINEAR || — || align=right | 3.0 km || 
|-id=461 bgcolor=#E9E9E9
| 493461 ||  || — || April 15, 2012 || Catalina || CSS || GEF || align=right | 1.6 km || 
|-id=462 bgcolor=#d6d6d6
| 493462 ||  || — || November 17, 2009 || Kitt Peak || Spacewatch || — || align=right | 3.2 km || 
|-id=463 bgcolor=#d6d6d6
| 493463 ||  || — || November 20, 2003 || Kitt Peak || Spacewatch || EOS || align=right | 1.9 km || 
|-id=464 bgcolor=#E9E9E9
| 493464 ||  || — || March 10, 2007 || Mount Lemmon || Mount Lemmon Survey || — || align=right | 1.2 km || 
|-id=465 bgcolor=#d6d6d6
| 493465 ||  || — || March 15, 2011 || Mount Lemmon || Mount Lemmon Survey || — || align=right | 3.3 km || 
|-id=466 bgcolor=#d6d6d6
| 493466 ||  || — || October 7, 2008 || Mount Lemmon || Mount Lemmon Survey || EOS || align=right | 1.8 km || 
|-id=467 bgcolor=#E9E9E9
| 493467 ||  || — || June 17, 2005 || Mount Lemmon || Mount Lemmon Survey || — || align=right | 1.9 km || 
|-id=468 bgcolor=#fefefe
| 493468 ||  || — || December 14, 2001 || Socorro || LINEAR || — || align=right data-sort-value="0.63" | 630 m || 
|-id=469 bgcolor=#d6d6d6
| 493469 ||  || — || October 15, 2013 || Kitt Peak || Spacewatch || — || align=right | 2.5 km || 
|-id=470 bgcolor=#d6d6d6
| 493470 ||  || — || March 27, 2010 || WISE || WISE || — || align=right | 3.1 km || 
|-id=471 bgcolor=#d6d6d6
| 493471 ||  || — || August 30, 2014 || Haleakala || Pan-STARRS || — || align=right | 3.4 km || 
|-id=472 bgcolor=#C2FFFF
| 493472 ||  || — || September 16, 2009 || Kitt Peak || Spacewatch || L4 || align=right | 7.7 km || 
|-id=473 bgcolor=#d6d6d6
| 493473 ||  || — || January 12, 2010 || WISE || WISE || — || align=right | 4.1 km || 
|-id=474 bgcolor=#d6d6d6
| 493474 ||  || — || October 26, 2008 || Kitt Peak || Spacewatch || — || align=right | 4.0 km || 
|-id=475 bgcolor=#d6d6d6
| 493475 ||  || — || January 8, 2010 || Mount Lemmon || Mount Lemmon Survey || — || align=right | 2.8 km || 
|-id=476 bgcolor=#d6d6d6
| 493476 ||  || — || March 27, 2011 || Mount Lemmon || Mount Lemmon Survey || — || align=right | 2.5 km || 
|-id=477 bgcolor=#d6d6d6
| 493477 ||  || — || March 13, 2010 || WISE || WISE || — || align=right | 4.6 km || 
|-id=478 bgcolor=#d6d6d6
| 493478 ||  || — || May 3, 2011 || Kitt Peak || Spacewatch || — || align=right | 3.4 km || 
|-id=479 bgcolor=#d6d6d6
| 493479 ||  || — || November 21, 2014 || Haleakala || Pan-STARRS || — || align=right | 2.4 km || 
|-id=480 bgcolor=#C2E0FF
| 493480 ||  || — || December 29, 2014 || Haleakala || Pan-STARRS || other TNO || align=right | 375 km || 
|-id=481 bgcolor=#d6d6d6
| 493481 ||  || — || September 27, 2013 || Haleakala || Pan-STARRS || — || align=right | 3.6 km || 
|-id=482 bgcolor=#E9E9E9
| 493482 ||  || — || October 3, 2013 || Haleakala || Pan-STARRS || — || align=right | 2.8 km || 
|-id=483 bgcolor=#fefefe
| 493483 ||  || — || August 27, 2006 || Kitt Peak || Spacewatch || MAS || align=right data-sort-value="0.64" | 640 m || 
|-id=484 bgcolor=#d6d6d6
| 493484 ||  || — || October 31, 2008 || Mount Lemmon || Mount Lemmon Survey || — || align=right | 2.0 km || 
|-id=485 bgcolor=#E9E9E9
| 493485 ||  || — || March 10, 2007 || Mount Lemmon || Mount Lemmon Survey || — || align=right | 1.6 km || 
|-id=486 bgcolor=#E9E9E9
| 493486 ||  || — || September 25, 1995 || Kitt Peak || Spacewatch || — || align=right | 2.0 km || 
|-id=487 bgcolor=#d6d6d6
| 493487 ||  || — || December 18, 2009 || Mount Lemmon || Mount Lemmon Survey || — || align=right | 2.0 km || 
|-id=488 bgcolor=#E9E9E9
| 493488 ||  || — || October 4, 2004 || Kitt Peak || Spacewatch || AGN || align=right data-sort-value="0.83" | 830 m || 
|-id=489 bgcolor=#E9E9E9
| 493489 ||  || — || October 3, 2013 || Haleakala || Pan-STARRS || — || align=right | 2.2 km || 
|-id=490 bgcolor=#E9E9E9
| 493490 ||  || — || February 4, 2006 || Mount Lemmon || Mount Lemmon Survey || — || align=right | 1.5 km || 
|-id=491 bgcolor=#E9E9E9
| 493491 ||  || — || February 2, 2006 || Kitt Peak || Spacewatch || — || align=right | 1.7 km || 
|-id=492 bgcolor=#d6d6d6
| 493492 ||  || — || April 29, 2006 || Kitt Peak || Spacewatch || — || align=right | 4.4 km || 
|-id=493 bgcolor=#E9E9E9
| 493493 ||  || — || October 17, 1960 || Palomar || PLS || — || align=right | 1.2 km || 
|-id=494 bgcolor=#d6d6d6
| 493494 ||  || — || January 12, 2010 || Kitt Peak || Spacewatch || — || align=right | 2.8 km || 
|-id=495 bgcolor=#d6d6d6
| 493495 ||  || — || January 1, 2009 || Mount Lemmon || Mount Lemmon Survey || — || align=right | 2.9 km || 
|-id=496 bgcolor=#d6d6d6
| 493496 ||  || — || October 3, 2013 || Haleakala || Pan-STARRS || — || align=right | 2.6 km || 
|-id=497 bgcolor=#fefefe
| 493497 ||  || — || February 26, 2012 || Haleakala || Pan-STARRS || — || align=right data-sort-value="0.78" | 780 m || 
|-id=498 bgcolor=#d6d6d6
| 493498 ||  || — || November 1, 2013 || Mount Lemmon || Mount Lemmon Survey || EOS || align=right | 1.7 km || 
|-id=499 bgcolor=#d6d6d6
| 493499 ||  || — || October 24, 2008 || Kitt Peak || Spacewatch || THM || align=right | 2.0 km || 
|-id=500 bgcolor=#E9E9E9
| 493500 ||  || — || April 2, 2011 || Haleakala || Pan-STARRS || HOF || align=right | 2.3 km || 
|}

493501–493600 

|-bgcolor=#E9E9E9
| 493501 ||  || — || October 4, 2004 || Kitt Peak || Spacewatch ||  || align=right | 1.6 km || 
|-id=502 bgcolor=#d6d6d6
| 493502 ||  || — || February 15, 2010 || Kitt Peak || Spacewatch || — || align=right | 2.3 km || 
|-id=503 bgcolor=#E9E9E9
| 493503 ||  || — || March 31, 2011 || Haleakala || Pan-STARRS || — || align=right | 2.5 km || 
|-id=504 bgcolor=#d6d6d6
| 493504 ||  || — || January 2, 2009 || Mount Lemmon || Mount Lemmon Survey || HYG || align=right | 3.1 km || 
|-id=505 bgcolor=#d6d6d6
| 493505 ||  || — || September 11, 2007 || Mount Lemmon || Mount Lemmon Survey || — || align=right | 2.8 km || 
|-id=506 bgcolor=#d6d6d6
| 493506 ||  || — || January 28, 2007 || Kitt Peak || Spacewatch || 3:2 || align=right | 3.6 km || 
|-id=507 bgcolor=#d6d6d6
| 493507 ||  || — || October 8, 2008 || Kitt Peak || Spacewatch || KOR || align=right | 1.2 km || 
|-id=508 bgcolor=#E9E9E9
| 493508 ||  || — || March 26, 2007 || Mount Lemmon || Mount Lemmon Survey || — || align=right | 1.7 km || 
|-id=509 bgcolor=#d6d6d6
| 493509 ||  || — || October 25, 2008 || Mount Lemmon || Mount Lemmon Survey || TEL || align=right | 1.1 km || 
|-id=510 bgcolor=#E9E9E9
| 493510 ||  || — || December 13, 2006 || Kitt Peak || Spacewatch || — || align=right | 1.1 km || 
|-id=511 bgcolor=#C2FFFF
| 493511 ||  || — || August 12, 2010 || Kitt Peak || Spacewatch || L4 || align=right | 9.5 km || 
|-id=512 bgcolor=#E9E9E9
| 493512 ||  || — || April 8, 2002 || Kitt Peak || Spacewatch || HOF || align=right | 2.9 km || 
|-id=513 bgcolor=#d6d6d6
| 493513 ||  || — || March 8, 2005 || Mount Lemmon || Mount Lemmon Survey || — || align=right | 2.1 km || 
|-id=514 bgcolor=#E9E9E9
| 493514 ||  || — || November 11, 2004 || Kitt Peak || Spacewatch || AGN || align=right | 1.2 km || 
|-id=515 bgcolor=#d6d6d6
| 493515 ||  || — || October 15, 2007 || Mount Lemmon || Mount Lemmon Survey || — || align=right | 2.2 km || 
|-id=516 bgcolor=#d6d6d6
| 493516 ||  || — || September 17, 2013 || Mount Lemmon || Mount Lemmon Survey || — || align=right | 2.9 km || 
|-id=517 bgcolor=#d6d6d6
| 493517 ||  || — || August 15, 2013 || La Sagra || OAM Obs. || — || align=right | 3.8 km || 
|-id=518 bgcolor=#d6d6d6
| 493518 ||  || — || March 26, 2006 || Kitt Peak || Spacewatch || — || align=right | 2.4 km || 
|-id=519 bgcolor=#d6d6d6
| 493519 ||  || — || October 5, 2013 || Kitt Peak || Spacewatch || — || align=right | 2.6 km || 
|-id=520 bgcolor=#d6d6d6
| 493520 ||  || — || April 4, 2005 || Mount Lemmon || Mount Lemmon Survey || — || align=right | 3.6 km || 
|-id=521 bgcolor=#d6d6d6
| 493521 ||  || — || October 11, 2007 || Mount Lemmon || Mount Lemmon Survey || — || align=right | 2.3 km || 
|-id=522 bgcolor=#d6d6d6
| 493522 ||  || — || February 11, 2004 || Kitt Peak || Spacewatch || — || align=right | 2.3 km || 
|-id=523 bgcolor=#d6d6d6
| 493523 ||  || — || November 26, 2013 || Mount Lemmon || Mount Lemmon Survey || — || align=right | 3.1 km || 
|-id=524 bgcolor=#E9E9E9
| 493524 ||  || — || April 8, 2006 || Mount Lemmon || Mount Lemmon Survey || — || align=right | 2.3 km || 
|-id=525 bgcolor=#d6d6d6
| 493525 ||  || — || April 14, 2004 || Kitt Peak || Spacewatch ||  || align=right | 2.8 km || 
|-id=526 bgcolor=#C2FFFF
| 493526 ||  || — || September 24, 2008 || Kitt Peak || Spacewatch || L4 || align=right | 7.1 km || 
|-id=527 bgcolor=#d6d6d6
| 493527 ||  || — || October 8, 2012 || Mount Lemmon || Mount Lemmon Survey || — || align=right | 2.2 km || 
|-id=528 bgcolor=#E9E9E9
| 493528 ||  || — || November 1, 2008 || Mount Lemmon || Mount Lemmon Survey || MRX || align=right | 1.0 km || 
|-id=529 bgcolor=#fefefe
| 493529 ||  || — || September 19, 2006 || Kitt Peak || Spacewatch || — || align=right data-sort-value="0.61" | 610 m || 
|-id=530 bgcolor=#d6d6d6
| 493530 ||  || — || October 10, 2007 || Kitt Peak || Spacewatch || KOR || align=right | 1.4 km || 
|-id=531 bgcolor=#C2FFFF
| 493531 ||  || — || September 13, 2007 || Mount Lemmon || Mount Lemmon Survey || L4 || align=right | 9.2 km || 
|-id=532 bgcolor=#C2FFFF
| 493532 ||  || — || September 15, 2009 || Kitt Peak || Spacewatch || L4 || align=right | 9.5 km || 
|-id=533 bgcolor=#C2FFFF
| 493533 ||  || — || October 22, 2009 || Mount Lemmon || Mount Lemmon Survey || L4 || align=right | 6.6 km || 
|-id=534 bgcolor=#C2FFFF
| 493534 ||  || — || September 12, 2009 || Kitt Peak || Spacewatch || L4 || align=right | 7.3 km || 
|-id=535 bgcolor=#C2FFFF
| 493535 ||  || — || September 12, 2009 || Kitt Peak || Spacewatch || L4 || align=right | 6.6 km || 
|-id=536 bgcolor=#d6d6d6
| 493536 ||  || — || October 7, 2007 || Mount Lemmon || Mount Lemmon Survey || — || align=right | 2.7 km || 
|-id=537 bgcolor=#fefefe
| 493537 ||  || — || February 4, 2011 || Haleakala || Pan-STARRS || MAS || align=right data-sort-value="0.78" | 780 m || 
|-id=538 bgcolor=#E9E9E9
| 493538 ||  || — || March 14, 2007 || Kitt Peak || Spacewatch || — || align=right data-sort-value="0.63" | 630 m || 
|-id=539 bgcolor=#fefefe
| 493539 ||  || — || December 10, 2010 || Mount Lemmon || Mount Lemmon Survey || — || align=right data-sort-value="0.85" | 850 m || 
|-id=540 bgcolor=#E9E9E9
| 493540 ||  || — || January 30, 2006 || Kitt Peak || Spacewatch || — || align=right | 1.5 km || 
|-id=541 bgcolor=#d6d6d6
| 493541 ||  || — || January 21, 2010 || WISE || WISE || — || align=right | 2.0 km || 
|-id=542 bgcolor=#fefefe
| 493542 ||  || — || October 17, 2012 || Haleakala || Pan-STARRS || — || align=right data-sort-value="0.76" | 760 m || 
|-id=543 bgcolor=#d6d6d6
| 493543 ||  || — || October 9, 2007 || Kitt Peak || Spacewatch || — || align=right | 2.8 km || 
|-id=544 bgcolor=#E9E9E9
| 493544 ||  || — || March 10, 2003 || Kitt Peak || Spacewatch || — || align=right | 1.0 km || 
|-id=545 bgcolor=#d6d6d6
| 493545 ||  || — || September 17, 2006 || Catalina || CSS || — || align=right | 2.5 km || 
|-id=546 bgcolor=#E9E9E9
| 493546 ||  || — || April 8, 2006 || Mount Lemmon || Mount Lemmon Survey || — || align=right | 2.1 km || 
|-id=547 bgcolor=#E9E9E9
| 493547 ||  || — || May 24, 2011 || Haleakala || Pan-STARRS || — || align=right | 1.0 km || 
|-id=548 bgcolor=#fefefe
| 493548 ||  || — || September 28, 2009 || Kitt Peak || Spacewatch || — || align=right data-sort-value="0.86" | 860 m || 
|-id=549 bgcolor=#fefefe
| 493549 ||  || — || February 25, 2011 || Mount Lemmon || Mount Lemmon Survey || MAS || align=right data-sort-value="0.75" | 750 m || 
|-id=550 bgcolor=#fefefe
| 493550 ||  || — || January 30, 2011 || Haleakala || Pan-STARRS || — || align=right data-sort-value="0.99" | 990 m || 
|-id=551 bgcolor=#d6d6d6
| 493551 ||  || — || March 15, 2009 || La Sagra || OAM Obs. || — || align=right | 3.2 km || 
|-id=552 bgcolor=#d6d6d6
| 493552 ||  || — || April 14, 2004 || Anderson Mesa || LONEOS || — || align=right | 3.6 km || 
|-id=553 bgcolor=#E9E9E9
| 493553 ||  || — || October 18, 2012 || Haleakala || Pan-STARRS || EUN || align=right | 1.3 km || 
|-id=554 bgcolor=#E9E9E9
| 493554 ||  || — || October 18, 2012 || Haleakala || Pan-STARRS || — || align=right | 1.7 km || 
|-id=555 bgcolor=#FA8072
| 493555 ||  || — || April 10, 2005 || Mount Lemmon || Mount Lemmon Survey || — || align=right data-sort-value="0.67" | 670 m || 
|-id=556 bgcolor=#E9E9E9
| 493556 ||  || — || September 15, 2012 || Kitt Peak || Spacewatch || KON || align=right | 2.2 km || 
|-id=557 bgcolor=#d6d6d6
| 493557 ||  || — || March 13, 2005 || Kitt Peak || Spacewatch || — || align=right | 3.0 km || 
|-id=558 bgcolor=#d6d6d6
| 493558 ||  || — || November 20, 2001 || Socorro || LINEAR || — || align=right | 3.6 km || 
|-id=559 bgcolor=#E9E9E9
| 493559 ||  || — || October 9, 2012 || Haleakala || Pan-STARRS || (1547) || align=right | 1.9 km || 
|-id=560 bgcolor=#d6d6d6
| 493560 ||  || — || November 14, 2006 || Mount Lemmon || Mount Lemmon Survey || — || align=right | 2.4 km || 
|-id=561 bgcolor=#fefefe
| 493561 ||  || — || March 14, 2007 || Kitt Peak || Spacewatch || NYS || align=right data-sort-value="0.61" | 610 m || 
|-id=562 bgcolor=#d6d6d6
| 493562 ||  || — || August 31, 2005 || Kitt Peak || Spacewatch || HYG || align=right | 3.1 km || 
|-id=563 bgcolor=#d6d6d6
| 493563 ||  || — || August 9, 2011 || Haleakala || Pan-STARRS || — || align=right | 2.1 km || 
|-id=564 bgcolor=#E9E9E9
| 493564 ||  || — || October 9, 2012 || Mount Lemmon || Mount Lemmon Survey || — || align=right | 1.0 km || 
|-id=565 bgcolor=#E9E9E9
| 493565 ||  || — || May 6, 2006 || Mount Lemmon || Mount Lemmon Survey || — || align=right | 2.1 km || 
|-id=566 bgcolor=#d6d6d6
| 493566 ||  || — || September 24, 2011 || Haleakala || Pan-STARRS || — || align=right | 2.8 km || 
|-id=567 bgcolor=#fefefe
| 493567 ||  || — || March 4, 2008 || Mount Lemmon || Mount Lemmon Survey || — || align=right data-sort-value="0.81" | 810 m || 
|-id=568 bgcolor=#E9E9E9
| 493568 ||  || — || December 1, 2003 || Kitt Peak || Spacewatch || — || align=right | 2.2 km || 
|-id=569 bgcolor=#d6d6d6
| 493569 ||  || — || September 25, 2011 || Haleakala || Pan-STARRS || EOS || align=right | 1.8 km || 
|-id=570 bgcolor=#d6d6d6
| 493570 ||  || — || April 19, 2007 || Mount Lemmon || Mount Lemmon Survey || SHU3:2 || align=right | 5.8 km || 
|-id=571 bgcolor=#d6d6d6
| 493571 ||  || — || February 28, 2014 || Haleakala || Pan-STARRS || — || align=right | 2.5 km || 
|-id=572 bgcolor=#E9E9E9
| 493572 ||  || — || March 24, 2006 || Kitt Peak || Spacewatch || — || align=right | 1.7 km || 
|-id=573 bgcolor=#d6d6d6
| 493573 ||  || — || September 27, 2006 || Kitt Peak || Spacewatch || — || align=right | 2.9 km || 
|-id=574 bgcolor=#d6d6d6
| 493574 ||  || — || September 25, 2011 || Haleakala || Pan-STARRS || — || align=right | 3.2 km || 
|-id=575 bgcolor=#d6d6d6
| 493575 ||  || — || October 20, 2006 || Mount Lemmon || Mount Lemmon Survey || — || align=right | 3.4 km || 
|-id=576 bgcolor=#E9E9E9
| 493576 ||  || — || January 23, 2006 || Kitt Peak || Spacewatch || — || align=right | 1.5 km || 
|-id=577 bgcolor=#fefefe
| 493577 ||  || — || January 24, 2007 || Mount Lemmon || Mount Lemmon Survey || MAS || align=right data-sort-value="0.61" | 610 m || 
|-id=578 bgcolor=#d6d6d6
| 493578 ||  || — || January 25, 2014 || Haleakala || Pan-STARRS || HYG || align=right | 2.3 km || 
|-id=579 bgcolor=#d6d6d6
| 493579 ||  || — || September 26, 2011 || Haleakala || Pan-STARRS || — || align=right | 2.1 km || 
|-id=580 bgcolor=#E9E9E9
| 493580 ||  || — || January 9, 2014 || Mount Lemmon || Mount Lemmon Survey || — || align=right data-sort-value="0.93" | 930 m || 
|-id=581 bgcolor=#fefefe
| 493581 ||  || — || August 25, 2012 || Haleakala || Pan-STARRS || — || align=right data-sort-value="0.90" | 900 m || 
|-id=582 bgcolor=#d6d6d6
| 493582 ||  || — || February 15, 2013 || Haleakala || Pan-STARRS || VER || align=right | 3.1 km || 
|-id=583 bgcolor=#fefefe
| 493583 ||  || — || January 24, 2007 || Mount Lemmon || Mount Lemmon Survey || — || align=right data-sort-value="0.77" | 770 m || 
|-id=584 bgcolor=#fefefe
| 493584 ||  || — || October 23, 2009 || Mount Lemmon || Mount Lemmon Survey || V || align=right data-sort-value="0.65" | 650 m || 
|-id=585 bgcolor=#E9E9E9
| 493585 ||  || — || November 14, 2012 || Kitt Peak || Spacewatch || — || align=right | 2.3 km || 
|-id=586 bgcolor=#fefefe
| 493586 ||  || — || January 30, 2011 || Haleakala || Pan-STARRS || — || align=right data-sort-value="0.71" | 710 m || 
|-id=587 bgcolor=#d6d6d6
| 493587 ||  || — || January 28, 2007 || Mount Lemmon || Mount Lemmon Survey || — || align=right | 3.6 km || 
|-id=588 bgcolor=#d6d6d6
| 493588 ||  || — || November 19, 2007 || Kitt Peak || Spacewatch || EOS || align=right | 2.0 km || 
|-id=589 bgcolor=#E9E9E9
| 493589 ||  || — || October 19, 2012 || Haleakala || Pan-STARRS || — || align=right | 1.6 km || 
|-id=590 bgcolor=#d6d6d6
| 493590 ||  || — || September 27, 2011 || Mount Lemmon || Mount Lemmon Survey || EOS || align=right | 2.1 km || 
|-id=591 bgcolor=#d6d6d6
| 493591 ||  || — || November 19, 2003 || Kitt Peak || Spacewatch || BRA || align=right | 1.6 km || 
|-id=592 bgcolor=#d6d6d6
| 493592 ||  || — || October 22, 2012 || Haleakala || Pan-STARRS || EOS || align=right | 2.0 km || 
|-id=593 bgcolor=#d6d6d6
| 493593 ||  || — || September 5, 1999 || Kitt Peak || Spacewatch || — || align=right | 1.5 km || 
|-id=594 bgcolor=#d6d6d6
| 493594 ||  || — || February 10, 2008 || Kitt Peak || Spacewatch || EOS || align=right | 2.0 km || 
|-id=595 bgcolor=#d6d6d6
| 493595 ||  || — || November 1, 2005 || Kitt Peak || Spacewatch || — || align=right | 2.8 km || 
|-id=596 bgcolor=#d6d6d6
| 493596 ||  || — || September 3, 2010 || Mount Lemmon || Mount Lemmon Survey || — || align=right | 2.3 km || 
|-id=597 bgcolor=#E9E9E9
| 493597 ||  || — || September 19, 2007 || Kitt Peak || Spacewatch || — || align=right | 1.3 km || 
|-id=598 bgcolor=#d6d6d6
| 493598 ||  || — || October 25, 2011 || Haleakala || Pan-STARRS || EOS || align=right | 1.8 km || 
|-id=599 bgcolor=#d6d6d6
| 493599 ||  || — || April 5, 2014 || Haleakala || Pan-STARRS || EOS || align=right | 1.6 km || 
|-id=600 bgcolor=#d6d6d6
| 493600 ||  || — || November 16, 2000 || Kitt Peak || Spacewatch || — || align=right | 2.9 km || 
|}

493601–493700 

|-bgcolor=#d6d6d6
| 493601 ||  || — || July 19, 2010 || WISE || WISE || — || align=right | 2.1 km || 
|-id=602 bgcolor=#E9E9E9
| 493602 ||  || — || November 1, 2008 || Mount Lemmon || Mount Lemmon Survey || — || align=right data-sort-value="0.82" | 820 m || 
|-id=603 bgcolor=#E9E9E9
| 493603 ||  || — || March 27, 2014 || Haleakala || Pan-STARRS || — || align=right | 1.5 km || 
|-id=604 bgcolor=#d6d6d6
| 493604 ||  || — || June 19, 2010 || WISE || WISE || — || align=right | 3.6 km || 
|-id=605 bgcolor=#d6d6d6
| 493605 ||  || — || November 24, 2011 || Haleakala || Pan-STARRS || EOS || align=right | 1.4 km || 
|-id=606 bgcolor=#d6d6d6
| 493606 ||  || — || December 1, 2010 || Mount Lemmon || Mount Lemmon Survey || — || align=right | 2.8 km || 
|-id=607 bgcolor=#d6d6d6
| 493607 ||  || — || October 25, 2011 || Haleakala || Pan-STARRS || EOS || align=right | 1.7 km || 
|-id=608 bgcolor=#d6d6d6
| 493608 ||  || — || August 7, 2004 || Campo Imperatore || CINEOS || — || align=right | 3.3 km || 
|-id=609 bgcolor=#d6d6d6
| 493609 ||  || — || June 28, 2010 || WISE || WISE || — || align=right | 3.6 km || 
|-id=610 bgcolor=#E9E9E9
| 493610 ||  || — || September 20, 2011 || Haleakala || Pan-STARRS || — || align=right | 2.6 km || 
|-id=611 bgcolor=#fefefe
| 493611 ||  || — || September 21, 2008 || Mount Lemmon || Mount Lemmon Survey || — || align=right data-sort-value="0.82" | 820 m || 
|-id=612 bgcolor=#E9E9E9
| 493612 ||  || — || September 26, 2011 || Haleakala || Pan-STARRS || AGN || align=right | 1.1 km || 
|-id=613 bgcolor=#d6d6d6
| 493613 ||  || — || October 4, 2006 || Mount Lemmon || Mount Lemmon Survey || — || align=right | 2.4 km || 
|-id=614 bgcolor=#d6d6d6
| 493614 ||  || — || September 4, 2010 || Mount Lemmon || Mount Lemmon Survey || — || align=right | 3.1 km || 
|-id=615 bgcolor=#d6d6d6
| 493615 ||  || — || February 7, 2013 || Kitt Peak || Spacewatch || EOS || align=right | 1.7 km || 
|-id=616 bgcolor=#d6d6d6
| 493616 ||  || — || June 9, 2010 || WISE || WISE || — || align=right | 3.9 km || 
|-id=617 bgcolor=#d6d6d6
| 493617 ||  || — || September 11, 2004 || Socorro || LINEAR || LIX || align=right | 3.1 km || 
|-id=618 bgcolor=#E9E9E9
| 493618 ||  || — || September 27, 2011 || Mount Lemmon || Mount Lemmon Survey || — || align=right | 1.3 km || 
|-id=619 bgcolor=#E9E9E9
| 493619 ||  || — || January 6, 2013 || Kitt Peak || Spacewatch || — || align=right | 2.4 km || 
|-id=620 bgcolor=#d6d6d6
| 493620 ||  || — || July 29, 2015 || Haleakala || Pan-STARRS || — || align=right | 2.9 km || 
|-id=621 bgcolor=#E9E9E9
| 493621 ||  || — || November 29, 1994 || Kitt Peak || Spacewatch || — || align=right | 1.2 km || 
|-id=622 bgcolor=#d6d6d6
| 493622 ||  || — || November 14, 2006 || Kitt Peak || Spacewatch || — || align=right | 2.4 km || 
|-id=623 bgcolor=#E9E9E9
| 493623 ||  || — || April 20, 2014 || Mount Lemmon || Mount Lemmon Survey || — || align=right | 2.4 km || 
|-id=624 bgcolor=#d6d6d6
| 493624 ||  || — || September 5, 2010 || Mount Lemmon || Mount Lemmon Survey || — || align=right | 2.0 km || 
|-id=625 bgcolor=#d6d6d6
| 493625 ||  || — || March 26, 2009 || Kitt Peak || Spacewatch || — || align=right | 2.1 km || 
|-id=626 bgcolor=#fefefe
| 493626 ||  || — || September 11, 2007 || Mount Lemmon || Mount Lemmon Survey || H || align=right data-sort-value="0.60" | 600 m || 
|-id=627 bgcolor=#E9E9E9
| 493627 ||  || — || September 23, 2011 || Haleakala || Pan-STARRS || — || align=right | 1.8 km || 
|-id=628 bgcolor=#d6d6d6
| 493628 ||  || — || October 2, 2010 || Kitt Peak || Spacewatch || — || align=right | 2.4 km || 
|-id=629 bgcolor=#E9E9E9
| 493629 ||  || — || September 18, 2006 || Kitt Peak || Spacewatch || HOF || align=right | 2.1 km || 
|-id=630 bgcolor=#E9E9E9
| 493630 ||  || — || September 23, 2011 || Kitt Peak || Spacewatch || HOF || align=right | 2.4 km || 
|-id=631 bgcolor=#E9E9E9
| 493631 ||  || — || September 2, 2011 || Haleakala || Pan-STARRS || — || align=right | 2.0 km || 
|-id=632 bgcolor=#d6d6d6
| 493632 ||  || — || August 25, 2004 || Kitt Peak || Spacewatch || — || align=right | 2.7 km || 
|-id=633 bgcolor=#d6d6d6
| 493633 ||  || — || June 22, 2004 || Kitt Peak || Spacewatch || — || align=right | 3.2 km || 
|-id=634 bgcolor=#E9E9E9
| 493634 ||  || — || September 24, 2011 || Kitt Peak || Spacewatch || — || align=right | 2.0 km || 
|-id=635 bgcolor=#d6d6d6
| 493635 ||  || — || October 25, 2005 || Mount Lemmon || Mount Lemmon Survey || — || align=right | 1.4 km || 
|-id=636 bgcolor=#E9E9E9
| 493636 ||  || — || September 24, 2011 || Catalina || CSS || (1547) || align=right | 1.1 km || 
|-id=637 bgcolor=#E9E9E9
| 493637 ||  || — || October 31, 2011 || Mount Lemmon || Mount Lemmon Survey || — || align=right | 1.9 km || 
|-id=638 bgcolor=#E9E9E9
| 493638 ||  || — || October 24, 2011 || Mount Lemmon || Mount Lemmon Survey || — || align=right | 2.2 km || 
|-id=639 bgcolor=#d6d6d6
| 493639 ||  || — || February 15, 2013 || Haleakala || Pan-STARRS || — || align=right | 3.1 km || 
|-id=640 bgcolor=#fefefe
| 493640 ||  || — || February 14, 2010 || Kitt Peak || Spacewatch || — || align=right data-sort-value="0.82" | 820 m || 
|-id=641 bgcolor=#d6d6d6
| 493641 ||  || — || January 18, 2013 || Mount Lemmon || Mount Lemmon Survey || (1298) || align=right | 2.5 km || 
|-id=642 bgcolor=#fefefe
| 493642 ||  || — || September 25, 1998 || Kitt Peak || Spacewatch || H || align=right data-sort-value="0.79" | 790 m || 
|-id=643 bgcolor=#E9E9E9
| 493643 ||  || — || October 18, 2011 || Haleakala || Pan-STARRS || — || align=right | 1.2 km || 
|-id=644 bgcolor=#E9E9E9
| 493644 ||  || — || January 15, 2008 || Mount Lemmon || Mount Lemmon Survey || — || align=right | 2.1 km || 
|-id=645 bgcolor=#E9E9E9
| 493645 ||  || — || September 24, 1960 || Palomar || PLS || — || align=right | 1.1 km || 
|-id=646 bgcolor=#fefefe
| 493646 ||  || — || December 25, 2005 || Kitt Peak || Spacewatch || — || align=right data-sort-value="0.59" | 590 m || 
|-id=647 bgcolor=#E9E9E9
| 493647 ||  || — || July 25, 2006 || Mount Lemmon || Mount Lemmon Survey || — || align=right | 2.4 km || 
|-id=648 bgcolor=#fefefe
| 493648 ||  || — || December 24, 2005 || Kitt Peak || Spacewatch || — || align=right data-sort-value="0.54" | 540 m || 
|-id=649 bgcolor=#fefefe
| 493649 ||  || — || January 7, 2006 || Mount Lemmon || Mount Lemmon Survey || V || align=right data-sort-value="0.56" | 560 m || 
|-id=650 bgcolor=#E9E9E9
| 493650 ||  || — || March 4, 2013 || Haleakala || Pan-STARRS || — || align=right | 1.7 km || 
|-id=651 bgcolor=#d6d6d6
| 493651 ||  || — || March 6, 2008 || Mount Lemmon || Mount Lemmon Survey || — || align=right | 3.0 km || 
|-id=652 bgcolor=#E9E9E9
| 493652 ||  || — || January 19, 2008 || Mount Lemmon || Mount Lemmon Survey || (5) || align=right data-sort-value="0.72" | 720 m || 
|-id=653 bgcolor=#fefefe
| 493653 ||  || — || October 28, 2005 || Socorro || LINEAR || — || align=right data-sort-value="0.68" | 680 m || 
|-id=654 bgcolor=#fefefe
| 493654 ||  || — || December 10, 2004 || Kitt Peak || Spacewatch || — || align=right data-sort-value="0.78" | 780 m || 
|-id=655 bgcolor=#fefefe
| 493655 ||  || — || March 5, 2006 || Kitt Peak || Spacewatch || — || align=right data-sort-value="0.67" | 670 m || 
|-id=656 bgcolor=#fefefe
| 493656 ||  || — || November 19, 2008 || Mount Lemmon || Mount Lemmon Survey || — || align=right data-sort-value="0.75" | 750 m || 
|-id=657 bgcolor=#fefefe
| 493657 ||  || — || October 15, 2007 || Kitt Peak || Spacewatch || H || align=right data-sort-value="0.53" | 530 m || 
|-id=658 bgcolor=#d6d6d6
| 493658 ||  || — || October 27, 2005 || Mount Lemmon || Mount Lemmon Survey || — || align=right | 3.4 km || 
|-id=659 bgcolor=#fefefe
| 493659 ||  || — || September 1, 2000 || Socorro || LINEAR || — || align=right data-sort-value="0.75" | 750 m || 
|-id=660 bgcolor=#fefefe
| 493660 ||  || — || August 9, 2004 || Anderson Mesa || LONEOS || — || align=right data-sort-value="0.82" | 820 m || 
|-id=661 bgcolor=#fefefe
| 493661 ||  || — || October 8, 2004 || Anderson Mesa || LONEOS || MAS || align=right data-sort-value="0.68" | 680 m || 
|-id=662 bgcolor=#fefefe
| 493662 ||  || — || October 1, 2005 || Catalina || CSS || — || align=right data-sort-value="0.97" | 970 m || 
|-id=663 bgcolor=#fefefe
| 493663 ||  || — || January 5, 2006 || Kitt Peak || Spacewatch || — || align=right data-sort-value="0.65" | 650 m || 
|-id=664 bgcolor=#fefefe
| 493664 ||  || — || April 2, 2006 || Kitt Peak || Spacewatch || — || align=right | 1.1 km || 
|-id=665 bgcolor=#E9E9E9
| 493665 ||  || — || October 19, 2006 || Mount Lemmon || Mount Lemmon Survey || EUN || align=right data-sort-value="0.92" | 920 m || 
|-id=666 bgcolor=#E9E9E9
| 493666 ||  || — || September 19, 2011 || Catalina || CSS || — || align=right | 1.1 km || 
|-id=667 bgcolor=#fefefe
| 493667 ||  || — || February 24, 2014 || Haleakala || Pan-STARRS || H || align=right data-sort-value="0.77" | 770 m || 
|-id=668 bgcolor=#d6d6d6
| 493668 ||  || — || March 24, 2012 || Kitt Peak || Spacewatch || — || align=right | 3.3 km || 
|-id=669 bgcolor=#fefefe
| 493669 ||  || — || October 17, 2001 || Kitt Peak || Spacewatch || critical || align=right data-sort-value="0.54" | 540 m || 
|-id=670 bgcolor=#E9E9E9
| 493670 ||  || — || October 29, 2011 || Haleakala || Pan-STARRS || EUN || align=right | 1.1 km || 
|-id=671 bgcolor=#fefefe
| 493671 ||  || — || September 21, 2000 || Kitt Peak || Spacewatch || MAS || align=right data-sort-value="0.68" | 680 m || 
|-id=672 bgcolor=#E9E9E9
| 493672 ||  || — || October 16, 2007 || Kitt Peak || Spacewatch || — || align=right data-sort-value="0.98" | 980 m || 
|-id=673 bgcolor=#E9E9E9
| 493673 ||  || — || October 26, 2011 || Haleakala || Pan-STARRS || — || align=right | 1.00 km || 
|-id=674 bgcolor=#fefefe
| 493674 ||  || — || October 6, 2004 || Kitt Peak || Spacewatch || NYS || align=right data-sort-value="0.55" | 550 m || 
|-id=675 bgcolor=#E9E9E9
| 493675 ||  || — || February 12, 2004 || Kitt Peak || Spacewatch || — || align=right | 1.3 km || 
|-id=676 bgcolor=#fefefe
| 493676 ||  || — || October 28, 2005 || Mount Lemmon || Mount Lemmon Survey || — || align=right data-sort-value="0.52" | 520 m || 
|-id=677 bgcolor=#fefefe
| 493677 ||  || — || October 9, 2004 || Kitt Peak || Spacewatch || — || align=right data-sort-value="0.86" | 860 m || 
|-id=678 bgcolor=#E9E9E9
| 493678 ||  || — || January 11, 2008 || Catalina || CSS || — || align=right | 1.6 km || 
|-id=679 bgcolor=#d6d6d6
| 493679 ||  || — || December 21, 2006 || Mount Lemmon || Mount Lemmon Survey || — || align=right | 1.7 km || 
|-id=680 bgcolor=#fefefe
| 493680 ||  || — || January 7, 2009 || Kitt Peak || Spacewatch || critical || align=right data-sort-value="0.78" | 780 m || 
|-id=681 bgcolor=#fefefe
| 493681 ||  || — || November 20, 2008 || Mount Lemmon || Mount Lemmon Survey || — || align=right data-sort-value="0.98" | 980 m || 
|-id=682 bgcolor=#E9E9E9
| 493682 ||  || — || November 23, 2011 || Catalina || CSS || — || align=right | 1.1 km || 
|-id=683 bgcolor=#fefefe
| 493683 ||  || — || October 6, 2005 || Catalina || CSS || — || align=right data-sort-value="0.71" | 710 m || 
|-id=684 bgcolor=#d6d6d6
| 493684 ||  || — || September 7, 2015 || Catalina || CSS || THB || align=right | 3.5 km || 
|-id=685 bgcolor=#fefefe
| 493685 ||  || — || November 4, 2004 || Kitt Peak || Spacewatch || — || align=right data-sort-value="0.82" | 820 m || 
|-id=686 bgcolor=#fefefe
| 493686 ||  || — || October 25, 2000 || Socorro || LINEAR || — || align=right data-sort-value="0.75" | 750 m || 
|-id=687 bgcolor=#fefefe
| 493687 ||  || — || April 2, 2006 || Mount Lemmon || Mount Lemmon Survey || H || align=right data-sort-value="0.83" | 830 m || 
|-id=688 bgcolor=#E9E9E9
| 493688 ||  || — || October 25, 2011 || Haleakala || Pan-STARRS || RAF || align=right data-sort-value="0.85" | 850 m || 
|-id=689 bgcolor=#fefefe
| 493689 ||  || — || November 21, 2008 || Kitt Peak || Spacewatch || — || align=right data-sort-value="0.71" | 710 m || 
|-id=690 bgcolor=#E9E9E9
| 493690 ||  || — || December 29, 2008 || Mount Lemmon || Mount Lemmon Survey || — || align=right | 1.1 km || 
|-id=691 bgcolor=#fefefe
| 493691 ||  || — || January 20, 2009 || Catalina || CSS || — || align=right data-sort-value="0.90" | 900 m || 
|-id=692 bgcolor=#fefefe
| 493692 ||  || — || September 2, 2008 || Kitt Peak || Spacewatch || V || align=right data-sort-value="0.82" | 820 m || 
|-id=693 bgcolor=#fefefe
| 493693 ||  || — || November 29, 2005 || Kitt Peak || Spacewatch || — || align=right data-sort-value="0.90" | 900 m || 
|-id=694 bgcolor=#E9E9E9
| 493694 ||  || — || December 5, 2007 || Kitt Peak || Spacewatch || — || align=right data-sort-value="0.92" | 920 m || 
|-id=695 bgcolor=#fefefe
| 493695 ||  || — || January 2, 2000 || Kitt Peak || Spacewatch || — || align=right data-sort-value="0.65" | 650 m || 
|-id=696 bgcolor=#E9E9E9
| 493696 ||  || — || October 19, 2006 || Kitt Peak || Spacewatch || — || align=right | 1.7 km || 
|-id=697 bgcolor=#fefefe
| 493697 ||  || — || August 28, 2005 || Kitt Peak || Spacewatch || — || align=right data-sort-value="0.64" | 640 m || 
|-id=698 bgcolor=#fefefe
| 493698 ||  || — || September 28, 2011 || Mount Lemmon || Mount Lemmon Survey || MAS || align=right data-sort-value="0.86" | 860 m || 
|-id=699 bgcolor=#d6d6d6
| 493699 ||  || — || June 24, 2014 || Haleakala || Pan-STARRS || — || align=right | 2.6 km || 
|-id=700 bgcolor=#d6d6d6
| 493700 ||  || — || April 24, 2012 || Mount Lemmon || Mount Lemmon Survey || — || align=right | 2.2 km || 
|}

493701–493800 

|-bgcolor=#fefefe
| 493701 ||  || — || September 9, 2015 || Haleakala || Pan-STARRS || — || align=right data-sort-value="0.66" | 660 m || 
|-id=702 bgcolor=#d6d6d6
| 493702 ||  || — || March 13, 2007 || Mount Lemmon || Mount Lemmon Survey || EOS || align=right | 1.5 km || 
|-id=703 bgcolor=#fefefe
| 493703 ||  || — || November 19, 2008 || Mount Lemmon || Mount Lemmon Survey || critical || align=right data-sort-value="0.54" | 540 m || 
|-id=704 bgcolor=#E9E9E9
| 493704 ||  || — || August 28, 2015 || Haleakala || Pan-STARRS || — || align=right | 1.6 km || 
|-id=705 bgcolor=#E9E9E9
| 493705 ||  || — || October 25, 2011 || Haleakala || Pan-STARRS || — || align=right data-sort-value="0.98" | 980 m || 
|-id=706 bgcolor=#fefefe
| 493706 ||  || — || April 16, 2010 || WISE || WISE || — || align=right data-sort-value="0.67" | 670 m || 
|-id=707 bgcolor=#E9E9E9
| 493707 ||  || — || September 28, 2006 || Kitt Peak || Spacewatch || — || align=right | 1.3 km || 
|-id=708 bgcolor=#E9E9E9
| 493708 ||  || — || April 2, 2009 || Mount Lemmon || Mount Lemmon Survey || — || align=right | 1.3 km || 
|-id=709 bgcolor=#E9E9E9
| 493709 ||  || — || March 15, 2012 || Mount Lemmon || Mount Lemmon Survey || — || align=right | 1.8 km || 
|-id=710 bgcolor=#fefefe
| 493710 ||  || — || July 26, 2011 || Haleakala || Pan-STARRS || — || align=right data-sort-value="0.73" | 730 m || 
|-id=711 bgcolor=#fefefe
| 493711 ||  || — || March 17, 2007 || Kitt Peak || Spacewatch || — || align=right data-sort-value="0.62" | 620 m || 
|-id=712 bgcolor=#E9E9E9
| 493712 ||  || — || September 26, 2006 || Mount Lemmon || Mount Lemmon Survey || — || align=right | 1.2 km || 
|-id=713 bgcolor=#E9E9E9
| 493713 ||  || — || January 4, 2012 || Mount Lemmon || Mount Lemmon Survey || — || align=right | 1.2 km || 
|-id=714 bgcolor=#E9E9E9
| 493714 ||  || — || June 22, 2014 || Haleakala || Pan-STARRS || — || align=right | 2.0 km || 
|-id=715 bgcolor=#E9E9E9
| 493715 ||  || — || September 27, 2006 || Kitt Peak || Spacewatch || — || align=right | 1.7 km || 
|-id=716 bgcolor=#E9E9E9
| 493716 ||  || — || June 1, 2010 || WISE || WISE || — || align=right | 2.2 km || 
|-id=717 bgcolor=#E9E9E9
| 493717 ||  || — || January 18, 2012 || Kitt Peak || Spacewatch || DOR || align=right | 1.7 km || 
|-id=718 bgcolor=#fefefe
| 493718 ||  || — || January 17, 2013 || Mount Lemmon || Mount Lemmon Survey || — || align=right data-sort-value="0.76" | 760 m || 
|-id=719 bgcolor=#fefefe
| 493719 ||  || — || March 29, 2014 || Mount Lemmon || Mount Lemmon Survey || — || align=right data-sort-value="0.76" | 760 m || 
|-id=720 bgcolor=#fefefe
| 493720 ||  || — || September 25, 2008 || Mount Lemmon || Mount Lemmon Survey || — || align=right data-sort-value="0.52" | 520 m || 
|-id=721 bgcolor=#fefefe
| 493721 ||  || — || September 6, 2015 || Haleakala || Pan-STARRS || — || align=right data-sort-value="0.86" | 860 m || 
|-id=722 bgcolor=#fefefe
| 493722 ||  || — || August 23, 2011 || Haleakala || Pan-STARRS || MAS || align=right data-sort-value="0.71" | 710 m || 
|-id=723 bgcolor=#fefefe
| 493723 ||  || — || October 15, 1996 || Kitt Peak || Spacewatch || H || align=right data-sort-value="0.44" | 440 m || 
|-id=724 bgcolor=#d6d6d6
| 493724 ||  || — || May 27, 2009 || Kitt Peak || Spacewatch || — || align=right | 2.0 km || 
|-id=725 bgcolor=#E9E9E9
| 493725 ||  || — || September 19, 2006 || Catalina || CSS || — || align=right | 1.3 km || 
|-id=726 bgcolor=#E9E9E9
| 493726 ||  || — || September 9, 2015 || Haleakala || Pan-STARRS || — || align=right | 1.6 km || 
|-id=727 bgcolor=#fefefe
| 493727 ||  || — || December 3, 2012 || Mount Lemmon || Mount Lemmon Survey || — || align=right data-sort-value="0.70" | 700 m || 
|-id=728 bgcolor=#fefefe
| 493728 ||  || — || September 7, 2008 || Mount Lemmon || Mount Lemmon Survey || — || align=right data-sort-value="0.72" | 720 m || 
|-id=729 bgcolor=#E9E9E9
| 493729 ||  || — || October 9, 2015 || Haleakala || Pan-STARRS || — || align=right | 1.5 km || 
|-id=730 bgcolor=#E9E9E9
| 493730 ||  || — || April 2, 2013 || Haleakala || Pan-STARRS || — || align=right data-sort-value="0.84" | 840 m || 
|-id=731 bgcolor=#fefefe
| 493731 ||  || — || October 28, 2008 || Mount Lemmon || Mount Lemmon Survey || V || align=right data-sort-value="0.67" | 670 m || 
|-id=732 bgcolor=#fefefe
| 493732 ||  || — || August 23, 2004 || Siding Spring || SSS || — || align=right data-sort-value="0.82" | 820 m || 
|-id=733 bgcolor=#fefefe
| 493733 ||  || — || September 23, 2008 || Mount Lemmon || Mount Lemmon Survey || — || align=right data-sort-value="0.74" | 740 m || 
|-id=734 bgcolor=#fefefe
| 493734 ||  || — || September 14, 1998 || Kitt Peak || Spacewatch || — || align=right data-sort-value="0.75" | 750 m || 
|-id=735 bgcolor=#E9E9E9
| 493735 ||  || — || December 6, 2011 || Haleakala || Pan-STARRS || — || align=right | 1.6 km || 
|-id=736 bgcolor=#E9E9E9
| 493736 ||  || — || October 1, 2011 || Mount Lemmon || Mount Lemmon Survey || — || align=right | 1.2 km || 
|-id=737 bgcolor=#fefefe
| 493737 ||  || — || October 3, 1997 || Kitt Peak || Spacewatch || — || align=right data-sort-value="0.71" | 710 m || 
|-id=738 bgcolor=#E9E9E9
| 493738 ||  || — || February 8, 2010 || WISE || WISE || RAF || align=right | 1.0 km || 
|-id=739 bgcolor=#d6d6d6
| 493739 ||  || — || September 8, 2015 || XuYi || PMO NEO || — || align=right | 3.0 km || 
|-id=740 bgcolor=#E9E9E9
| 493740 ||  || — || March 17, 2004 || Kitt Peak || Spacewatch || — || align=right | 1.5 km || 
|-id=741 bgcolor=#fefefe
| 493741 ||  || — || May 11, 1996 || Kitt Peak || Spacewatch || H || align=right data-sort-value="0.62" | 620 m || 
|-id=742 bgcolor=#fefefe
| 493742 ||  || — || April 21, 2006 || Mount Lemmon || Mount Lemmon Survey || — || align=right data-sort-value="0.82" | 820 m || 
|-id=743 bgcolor=#fefefe
| 493743 ||  || — || October 7, 2004 || Socorro || LINEAR || MAS || align=right data-sort-value="0.65" | 650 m || 
|-id=744 bgcolor=#fefefe
| 493744 ||  || — || January 2, 2009 || Mount Lemmon || Mount Lemmon Survey || NYS || align=right data-sort-value="0.52" | 520 m || 
|-id=745 bgcolor=#E9E9E9
| 493745 ||  || — || October 24, 2011 || Mount Lemmon || Mount Lemmon Survey || — || align=right | 1.9 km || 
|-id=746 bgcolor=#d6d6d6
| 493746 ||  || — || November 5, 2004 || Kitt Peak || Spacewatch || — || align=right | 3.5 km || 
|-id=747 bgcolor=#d6d6d6
| 493747 ||  || — || September 24, 2009 || Mount Lemmon || Mount Lemmon Survey || — || align=right | 3.4 km || 
|-id=748 bgcolor=#E9E9E9
| 493748 ||  || — || January 31, 2008 || Catalina || CSS || — || align=right | 1.3 km || 
|-id=749 bgcolor=#E9E9E9
| 493749 ||  || — || October 24, 2011 || Mount Lemmon || Mount Lemmon Survey || MAR || align=right data-sort-value="0.99" | 990 m || 
|-id=750 bgcolor=#fefefe
| 493750 ||  || — || August 31, 2011 || Haleakala || Pan-STARRS || — || align=right data-sort-value="0.82" | 820 m || 
|-id=751 bgcolor=#d6d6d6
| 493751 ||  || — || January 13, 2010 || WISE || WISE || — || align=right | 2.4 km || 
|-id=752 bgcolor=#E9E9E9
| 493752 ||  || — || September 26, 1998 || Kitt Peak || Spacewatch || — || align=right | 1.2 km || 
|-id=753 bgcolor=#fefefe
| 493753 ||  || — || April 25, 2006 || Mount Lemmon || Mount Lemmon Survey || H || align=right data-sort-value="0.47" | 470 m || 
|-id=754 bgcolor=#E9E9E9
| 493754 ||  || — || October 26, 2011 || Haleakala || Pan-STARRS || — || align=right | 1.2 km || 
|-id=755 bgcolor=#fefefe
| 493755 ||  || — || October 1, 2005 || Mount Lemmon || Mount Lemmon Survey || — || align=right data-sort-value="0.57" | 570 m || 
|-id=756 bgcolor=#fefefe
| 493756 ||  || — || December 5, 2010 || Haleakala || Pan-STARRS || H || align=right data-sort-value="0.58" | 580 m || 
|-id=757 bgcolor=#fefefe
| 493757 ||  || — || March 3, 2006 || Kitt Peak || Spacewatch || V || align=right data-sort-value="0.64" | 640 m || 
|-id=758 bgcolor=#fefefe
| 493758 ||  || — || May 11, 2010 || Kitt Peak || Spacewatch || — || align=right data-sort-value="0.64" | 640 m || 
|-id=759 bgcolor=#E9E9E9
| 493759 ||  || — || November 13, 2007 || Mount Lemmon || Mount Lemmon Survey || (5) || align=right data-sort-value="0.83" | 830 m || 
|-id=760 bgcolor=#E9E9E9
| 493760 ||  || — || January 21, 2013 || Haleakala || Pan-STARRS || — || align=right | 1.3 km || 
|-id=761 bgcolor=#fefefe
| 493761 ||  || — || December 20, 2009 || Mount Lemmon || Mount Lemmon Survey || — || align=right data-sort-value="0.51" | 510 m || 
|-id=762 bgcolor=#fefefe
| 493762 ||  || — || October 22, 2012 || Haleakala || Pan-STARRS || — || align=right data-sort-value="0.59" | 590 m || 
|-id=763 bgcolor=#E9E9E9
| 493763 ||  || — || July 28, 2010 || WISE || WISE || — || align=right | 2.1 km || 
|-id=764 bgcolor=#fefefe
| 493764 ||  || — || July 28, 2011 || Haleakala || Pan-STARRS || — || align=right data-sort-value="0.86" | 860 m || 
|-id=765 bgcolor=#E9E9E9
| 493765 ||  || — || October 22, 2006 || Catalina || CSS || — || align=right | 1.9 km || 
|-id=766 bgcolor=#fefefe
| 493766 ||  || — || December 10, 2004 || Kitt Peak || Spacewatch || — || align=right data-sort-value="0.82" | 820 m || 
|-id=767 bgcolor=#E9E9E9
| 493767 ||  || — || October 20, 2007 || Mount Lemmon || Mount Lemmon Survey || — || align=right | 1.1 km || 
|-id=768 bgcolor=#fefefe
| 493768 ||  || — || October 23, 2004 || Kitt Peak || Spacewatch || — || align=right data-sort-value="0.82" | 820 m || 
|-id=769 bgcolor=#E9E9E9
| 493769 ||  || — || March 14, 2013 || Mount Lemmon || Mount Lemmon Survey || — || align=right | 1.9 km || 
|-id=770 bgcolor=#E9E9E9
| 493770 ||  || — || October 23, 2011 || Haleakala || Pan-STARRS || BRG || align=right | 1.2 km || 
|-id=771 bgcolor=#fefefe
| 493771 ||  || — || September 24, 2008 || Kitt Peak || Spacewatch || — || align=right data-sort-value="0.71" | 710 m || 
|-id=772 bgcolor=#fefefe
| 493772 ||  || — || March 12, 2002 || Kitt Peak || Spacewatch || V || align=right data-sort-value="0.75" | 750 m || 
|-id=773 bgcolor=#fefefe
| 493773 ||  || — || November 18, 2008 || Kitt Peak || Spacewatch || — || align=right data-sort-value="0.54" | 540 m || 
|-id=774 bgcolor=#E9E9E9
| 493774 ||  || — || September 24, 2006 || Kitt Peak || Spacewatch || — || align=right | 1.7 km || 
|-id=775 bgcolor=#fefefe
| 493775 ||  || — || April 18, 2007 || Mount Lemmon || Mount Lemmon Survey || — || align=right data-sort-value="0.52" | 520 m || 
|-id=776 bgcolor=#E9E9E9
| 493776 ||  || — || December 30, 2007 || Mount Lemmon || Mount Lemmon Survey || MIS || align=right | 2.2 km || 
|-id=777 bgcolor=#fefefe
| 493777 ||  || — || February 14, 2010 || Kitt Peak || Spacewatch || — || align=right data-sort-value="0.64" | 640 m || 
|-id=778 bgcolor=#E9E9E9
| 493778 ||  || — || January 18, 2008 || Mount Lemmon || Mount Lemmon Survey || — || align=right | 1.2 km || 
|-id=779 bgcolor=#fefefe
| 493779 ||  || — || February 4, 2005 || Mount Lemmon || Mount Lemmon Survey || — || align=right data-sort-value="0.71" | 710 m || 
|-id=780 bgcolor=#fefefe
| 493780 ||  || — || August 27, 2011 || Haleakala || Pan-STARRS || MAS || align=right data-sort-value="0.68" | 680 m || 
|-id=781 bgcolor=#E9E9E9
| 493781 ||  || — || October 8, 2007 || Mount Lemmon || Mount Lemmon Survey || — || align=right data-sort-value="0.68" | 680 m || 
|-id=782 bgcolor=#d6d6d6
| 493782 ||  || — || January 30, 2012 || Mount Lemmon || Mount Lemmon Survey || — || align=right | 2.8 km || 
|-id=783 bgcolor=#d6d6d6
| 493783 ||  || — || March 2, 2012 || Kitt Peak || Spacewatch || — || align=right | 3.1 km || 
|-id=784 bgcolor=#fefefe
| 493784 ||  || — || February 8, 2013 || Haleakala || Pan-STARRS || — || align=right data-sort-value="0.69" | 690 m || 
|-id=785 bgcolor=#E9E9E9
| 493785 ||  || — || April 12, 2013 || Mount Lemmon || Mount Lemmon Survey || — || align=right | 1.3 km || 
|-id=786 bgcolor=#fefefe
| 493786 ||  || — || January 2, 2009 || Mount Lemmon || Mount Lemmon Survey || — || align=right data-sort-value="0.82" | 820 m || 
|-id=787 bgcolor=#E9E9E9
| 493787 ||  || — || December 25, 2006 || Anderson Mesa || LONEOS || — || align=right | 2.2 km || 
|-id=788 bgcolor=#E9E9E9
| 493788 ||  || — || April 2, 2009 || Kitt Peak || Spacewatch || — || align=right | 2.1 km || 
|-id=789 bgcolor=#d6d6d6
| 493789 ||  || — || October 12, 2010 || Kitt Peak || Spacewatch || Tj (2.99) || align=right | 3.0 km || 
|-id=790 bgcolor=#d6d6d6
| 493790 ||  || — || January 21, 2010 || WISE || WISE || — || align=right | 2.6 km || 
|-id=791 bgcolor=#fefefe
| 493791 ||  || — || August 30, 2005 || Kitt Peak || Spacewatch || — || align=right data-sort-value="0.57" | 570 m || 
|-id=792 bgcolor=#fefefe
| 493792 ||  || — || August 30, 2011 || Kitt Peak || Spacewatch || CLA || align=right | 1.2 km || 
|-id=793 bgcolor=#fefefe
| 493793 ||  || — || December 12, 2004 || Kitt Peak || Spacewatch || — || align=right data-sort-value="0.78" | 780 m || 
|-id=794 bgcolor=#d6d6d6
| 493794 ||  || — || February 1, 2005 || Catalina || CSS || — || align=right | 2.4 km || 
|-id=795 bgcolor=#d6d6d6
| 493795 ||  || — || January 30, 2011 || Catalina || CSS || Tj (2.97) || align=right | 3.4 km || 
|-id=796 bgcolor=#fefefe
| 493796 ||  || — || September 10, 2004 || Socorro || LINEAR || H || align=right data-sort-value="0.83" | 830 m || 
|-id=797 bgcolor=#E9E9E9
| 493797 ||  || — || April 1, 2013 || Mount Lemmon || Mount Lemmon Survey || EUN || align=right | 1.2 km || 
|-id=798 bgcolor=#d6d6d6
| 493798 ||  || — || December 3, 2010 || Catalina || CSS || — || align=right | 3.8 km || 
|-id=799 bgcolor=#fefefe
| 493799 ||  || — || November 18, 2008 || Kitt Peak || Spacewatch || V || align=right data-sort-value="0.75" | 750 m || 
|-id=800 bgcolor=#fefefe
| 493800 ||  || — || February 2, 2009 || Mount Lemmon || Mount Lemmon Survey || — || align=right | 1.0 km || 
|}

493801–493900 

|-bgcolor=#fefefe
| 493801 ||  || — || October 9, 2004 || Kitt Peak || Spacewatch || — || align=right data-sort-value="0.90" | 900 m || 
|-id=802 bgcolor=#E9E9E9
| 493802 ||  || — || February 27, 2009 || Catalina || CSS || — || align=right | 2.2 km || 
|-id=803 bgcolor=#E9E9E9
| 493803 ||  || — || September 17, 2010 || Mount Lemmon || Mount Lemmon Survey || — || align=right | 2.0 km || 
|-id=804 bgcolor=#E9E9E9
| 493804 ||  || — || January 19, 2012 || Mount Lemmon || Mount Lemmon Survey || EUN || align=right | 1.2 km || 
|-id=805 bgcolor=#fefefe
| 493805 ||  || — || January 10, 2013 || Haleakala || Pan-STARRS || — || align=right data-sort-value="0.64" | 640 m || 
|-id=806 bgcolor=#E9E9E9
| 493806 ||  || — || November 18, 2011 || Kitt Peak || Spacewatch || — || align=right | 1.3 km || 
|-id=807 bgcolor=#fefefe
| 493807 ||  || — || September 9, 2004 || Socorro || LINEAR || NYScritical || align=right data-sort-value="0.60" | 600 m || 
|-id=808 bgcolor=#fefefe
| 493808 ||  || — || June 13, 2004 || Kitt Peak || Spacewatch || H || align=right data-sort-value="0.69" | 690 m || 
|-id=809 bgcolor=#E9E9E9
| 493809 ||  || — || November 11, 1998 || Anderson Mesa || LONEOS || — || align=right | 1.5 km || 
|-id=810 bgcolor=#fefefe
| 493810 ||  || — || November 3, 2005 || Catalina || CSS || — || align=right data-sort-value="0.59" | 590 m || 
|-id=811 bgcolor=#fefefe
| 493811 ||  || — || March 23, 2006 || Mount Lemmon || Mount Lemmon Survey || — || align=right | 2.2 km || 
|-id=812 bgcolor=#fefefe
| 493812 ||  || — || November 29, 2000 || Kitt Peak || Spacewatch || V || align=right data-sort-value="0.79" | 790 m || 
|-id=813 bgcolor=#fefefe
| 493813 ||  || — || September 18, 2011 || Mount Lemmon || Mount Lemmon Survey || — || align=right data-sort-value="0.59" | 590 m || 
|-id=814 bgcolor=#E9E9E9
| 493814 ||  || — || April 21, 2009 || Mount Lemmon || Mount Lemmon Survey || — || align=right data-sort-value="0.98" | 980 m || 
|-id=815 bgcolor=#fefefe
| 493815 ||  || — || January 13, 2005 || Kitt Peak || Spacewatch || NYS || align=right data-sort-value="0.71" | 710 m || 
|-id=816 bgcolor=#fefefe
| 493816 ||  || — || January 3, 2013 || Mount Lemmon || Mount Lemmon Survey || — || align=right data-sort-value="0.71" | 710 m || 
|-id=817 bgcolor=#E9E9E9
| 493817 ||  || — || April 19, 2009 || Kitt Peak || Spacewatch || — || align=right data-sort-value="0.94" | 940 m || 
|-id=818 bgcolor=#fefefe
| 493818 ||  || — || October 9, 2004 || Kitt Peak || Spacewatch || — || align=right data-sort-value="0.83" | 830 m || 
|-id=819 bgcolor=#E9E9E9
| 493819 ||  || — || May 2, 2009 || La Sagra || OAM Obs. || — || align=right | 3.3 km || 
|-id=820 bgcolor=#d6d6d6
| 493820 ||  || — || August 17, 2009 || Kitt Peak || Spacewatch || — || align=right | 2.3 km || 
|-id=821 bgcolor=#E9E9E9
| 493821 ||  || — || January 30, 2004 || Kitt Peak || Spacewatch || — || align=right | 1.3 km || 
|-id=822 bgcolor=#fefefe
| 493822 ||  || — || November 3, 2008 || Mount Lemmon || Mount Lemmon Survey || — || align=right data-sort-value="0.68" | 680 m || 
|-id=823 bgcolor=#fefefe
| 493823 ||  || — || December 10, 2004 || Kitt Peak || Spacewatch || — || align=right | 1.1 km || 
|-id=824 bgcolor=#d6d6d6
| 493824 ||  || — || November 9, 2004 || Catalina || CSS || — || align=right | 2.8 km || 
|-id=825 bgcolor=#E9E9E9
| 493825 ||  || — || June 19, 2010 || Mount Lemmon || Mount Lemmon Survey || — || align=right | 1.1 km || 
|-id=826 bgcolor=#E9E9E9
| 493826 ||  || — || December 16, 2003 || Kitt Peak || Spacewatch || — || align=right | 1.2 km || 
|-id=827 bgcolor=#E9E9E9
| 493827 ||  || — || November 26, 2011 || Kitt Peak || Spacewatch || — || align=right | 1.1 km || 
|-id=828 bgcolor=#fefefe
| 493828 ||  || — || September 24, 2011 || Catalina || CSS || — || align=right data-sort-value="0.94" | 940 m || 
|-id=829 bgcolor=#E9E9E9
| 493829 ||  || — || April 27, 2010 || WISE || WISE || — || align=right | 1.4 km || 
|-id=830 bgcolor=#fefefe
| 493830 ||  || — || September 20, 2011 || Haleakala || Pan-STARRS || — || align=right | 1.2 km || 
|-id=831 bgcolor=#E9E9E9
| 493831 ||  || — || April 10, 2013 || Haleakala || Pan-STARRS || — || align=right | 1.6 km || 
|-id=832 bgcolor=#E9E9E9
| 493832 ||  || — || February 11, 2004 || Kitt Peak || Spacewatch || EUN || align=right data-sort-value="0.97" | 970 m || 
|-id=833 bgcolor=#d6d6d6
| 493833 ||  || — || March 25, 2012 || Mount Lemmon || Mount Lemmon Survey || — || align=right | 2.9 km || 
|-id=834 bgcolor=#d6d6d6
| 493834 ||  || — || November 28, 2010 || Kitt Peak || Spacewatch || — || align=right | 3.0 km || 
|-id=835 bgcolor=#fefefe
| 493835 ||  || — || August 25, 2011 || La Sagra || OAM Obs. || — || align=right data-sort-value="0.98" | 980 m || 
|-id=836 bgcolor=#E9E9E9
| 493836 ||  || — || November 4, 2010 || Mount Lemmon || Mount Lemmon Survey || — || align=right | 2.0 km || 
|-id=837 bgcolor=#fefefe
| 493837 ||  || — || September 17, 2011 || La Sagra || OAM Obs. || V || align=right data-sort-value="0.75" | 750 m || 
|-id=838 bgcolor=#E9E9E9
| 493838 ||  || — || January 2, 2012 || Mount Lemmon || Mount Lemmon Survey || EUN || align=right | 1.1 km || 
|-id=839 bgcolor=#d6d6d6
| 493839 ||  || — || September 15, 2014 || Haleakala || Pan-STARRS || — || align=right | 3.0 km || 
|-id=840 bgcolor=#fefefe
| 493840 ||  || — || January 26, 2006 || Mount Lemmon || Mount Lemmon Survey || V || align=right data-sort-value="0.65" | 650 m || 
|-id=841 bgcolor=#fefefe
| 493841 ||  || — || September 17, 2004 || Kitt Peak || Spacewatch || — || align=right data-sort-value="0.69" | 690 m || 
|-id=842 bgcolor=#d6d6d6
| 493842 ||  || — || October 6, 2004 || Kitt Peak || Spacewatch || — || align=right | 2.2 km || 
|-id=843 bgcolor=#E9E9E9
| 493843 ||  || — || January 29, 2004 || Socorro || LINEAR || (5) || align=right data-sort-value="0.89" | 890 m || 
|-id=844 bgcolor=#d6d6d6
| 493844 ||  || — || May 14, 2012 || Haleakala || Pan-STARRS || — || align=right | 2.9 km || 
|-id=845 bgcolor=#d6d6d6
| 493845 ||  || — || December 10, 2004 || Socorro || LINEAR || — || align=right | 2.4 km || 
|-id=846 bgcolor=#E9E9E9
| 493846 ||  || — || December 29, 2011 || Mount Lemmon || Mount Lemmon Survey || EUN || align=right | 1.0 km || 
|-id=847 bgcolor=#E9E9E9
| 493847 ||  || — || October 4, 2006 || Mount Lemmon || Mount Lemmon Survey || EUN || align=right | 1.4 km || 
|-id=848 bgcolor=#fefefe
| 493848 ||  || — || September 6, 2008 || Mount Lemmon || Mount Lemmon Survey || — || align=right data-sort-value="0.64" | 640 m || 
|-id=849 bgcolor=#fefefe
| 493849 ||  || — || February 20, 2009 || Kitt Peak || Spacewatch || — || align=right data-sort-value="0.84" | 840 m || 
|-id=850 bgcolor=#E9E9E9
| 493850 ||  || — || April 17, 2009 || Mount Lemmon || Mount Lemmon Survey || MAR || align=right data-sort-value="0.73" | 730 m || 
|-id=851 bgcolor=#E9E9E9
| 493851 ||  || — || February 28, 2008 || Kitt Peak || Spacewatch || — || align=right | 2.5 km || 
|-id=852 bgcolor=#d6d6d6
| 493852 ||  || — || November 4, 2004 || Kitt Peak || Spacewatch || — || align=right | 2.0 km || 
|-id=853 bgcolor=#E9E9E9
| 493853 ||  || — || August 18, 2014 || Haleakala || Pan-STARRS || — || align=right | 1.5 km || 
|-id=854 bgcolor=#E9E9E9
| 493854 ||  || — || January 13, 2008 || Mount Lemmon || Mount Lemmon Survey || (5) || align=right data-sort-value="0.61" | 610 m || 
|-id=855 bgcolor=#E9E9E9
| 493855 ||  || — || June 5, 2014 || Haleakala || Pan-STARRS || — || align=right | 1.1 km || 
|-id=856 bgcolor=#E9E9E9
| 493856 ||  || — || October 22, 2011 || Mount Lemmon || Mount Lemmon Survey || — || align=right | 1.5 km || 
|-id=857 bgcolor=#fefefe
| 493857 ||  || — || July 26, 2011 || Haleakala || Pan-STARRS || — || align=right data-sort-value="0.71" | 710 m || 
|-id=858 bgcolor=#E9E9E9
| 493858 ||  || — || October 19, 2006 || Kitt Peak || Spacewatch || — || align=right | 1.1 km || 
|-id=859 bgcolor=#d6d6d6
| 493859 ||  || — || March 13, 2012 || Catalina || CSS || — || align=right | 2.8 km || 
|-id=860 bgcolor=#fefefe
| 493860 ||  || — || September 23, 2011 || Haleakala || Pan-STARRS || — || align=right data-sort-value="0.75" | 750 m || 
|-id=861 bgcolor=#fefefe
| 493861 ||  || — || February 14, 2010 || Kitt Peak || Spacewatch || BAP || align=right data-sort-value="0.89" | 890 m || 
|-id=862 bgcolor=#E9E9E9
| 493862 ||  || — || January 25, 2012 || Haleakala || Pan-STARRS || — || align=right | 2.2 km || 
|-id=863 bgcolor=#d6d6d6
| 493863 ||  || — || March 24, 2012 || Mount Lemmon || Mount Lemmon Survey || — || align=right | 2.3 km || 
|-id=864 bgcolor=#E9E9E9
| 493864 ||  || — || October 22, 2011 || Mount Lemmon || Mount Lemmon Survey || MAR || align=right | 1.2 km || 
|-id=865 bgcolor=#fefefe
| 493865 ||  || — || August 30, 2011 || Haleakala || Pan-STARRS || — || align=right data-sort-value="0.96" | 960 m || 
|-id=866 bgcolor=#fefefe
| 493866 ||  || — || November 20, 2008 || Mount Lemmon || Mount Lemmon Survey || — || align=right data-sort-value="0.70" | 700 m || 
|-id=867 bgcolor=#d6d6d6
| 493867 ||  || — || February 1, 2012 || Mount Lemmon || Mount Lemmon Survey || — || align=right | 2.8 km || 
|-id=868 bgcolor=#E9E9E9
| 493868 ||  || — || September 27, 2006 || Kitt Peak || Spacewatch || MAR || align=right data-sort-value="0.75" | 750 m || 
|-id=869 bgcolor=#E9E9E9
| 493869 ||  || — || November 30, 2011 || Mount Lemmon || Mount Lemmon Survey || — || align=right data-sort-value="0.82" | 820 m || 
|-id=870 bgcolor=#E9E9E9
| 493870 ||  || — || December 31, 2007 || Kitt Peak || Spacewatch || — || align=right | 1.5 km || 
|-id=871 bgcolor=#fefefe
| 493871 ||  || — || March 14, 2007 || Mount Lemmon || Mount Lemmon Survey || (2076) || align=right data-sort-value="0.68" | 680 m || 
|-id=872 bgcolor=#d6d6d6
| 493872 ||  || — || June 28, 2014 || Haleakala || Pan-STARRS || — || align=right | 1.9 km || 
|-id=873 bgcolor=#d6d6d6
| 493873 ||  || — || April 16, 2012 || Haleakala || Pan-STARRS || — || align=right | 2.8 km || 
|-id=874 bgcolor=#fefefe
| 493874 ||  || — || September 14, 2007 || Kitt Peak || Spacewatch || critical || align=right data-sort-value="0.65" | 650 m || 
|-id=875 bgcolor=#d6d6d6
| 493875 ||  || — || July 28, 2014 || Haleakala || Pan-STARRS || EOS || align=right | 1.4 km || 
|-id=876 bgcolor=#d6d6d6
| 493876 ||  || — || December 25, 2005 || Kitt Peak || Spacewatch || — || align=right | 2.1 km || 
|-id=877 bgcolor=#E9E9E9
| 493877 ||  || — || February 7, 2008 || Mount Lemmon || Mount Lemmon Survey || — || align=right | 1.8 km || 
|-id=878 bgcolor=#fefefe
| 493878 ||  || — || December 1, 2005 || Mount Lemmon || Mount Lemmon Survey || — || align=right data-sort-value="0.88" | 880 m || 
|-id=879 bgcolor=#E9E9E9
| 493879 ||  || — || November 8, 2007 || Mount Lemmon || Mount Lemmon Survey || — || align=right data-sort-value="0.91" | 910 m || 
|-id=880 bgcolor=#E9E9E9
| 493880 ||  || — || April 8, 2008 || Mount Lemmon || Mount Lemmon Survey || — || align=right | 1.6 km || 
|-id=881 bgcolor=#fefefe
| 493881 ||  || — || September 26, 2011 || Mount Lemmon || Mount Lemmon Survey || — || align=right data-sort-value="0.71" | 710 m || 
|-id=882 bgcolor=#E9E9E9
| 493882 ||  || — || May 8, 2013 || Haleakala || Pan-STARRS || MAR || align=right | 1.0 km || 
|-id=883 bgcolor=#fefefe
| 493883 ||  || — || January 31, 2009 || Kitt Peak || Spacewatch || NYS || align=right data-sort-value="0.64" | 640 m || 
|-id=884 bgcolor=#d6d6d6
| 493884 ||  || — || August 22, 2014 || Haleakala || Pan-STARRS || — || align=right | 2.5 km || 
|-id=885 bgcolor=#d6d6d6
| 493885 ||  || — || December 3, 2010 || Mount Lemmon || Mount Lemmon Survey || EOS || align=right | 1.5 km || 
|-id=886 bgcolor=#E9E9E9
| 493886 ||  || — || October 26, 2011 || Haleakala || Pan-STARRS || — || align=right | 1.0 km || 
|-id=887 bgcolor=#d6d6d6
| 493887 ||  || — || September 18, 2003 || Kitt Peak || Spacewatch || THB || align=right | 2.6 km || 
|-id=888 bgcolor=#E9E9E9
| 493888 ||  || — || March 5, 2008 || Mount Lemmon || Mount Lemmon Survey || — || align=right | 1.8 km || 
|-id=889 bgcolor=#E9E9E9
| 493889 ||  || — || September 18, 2010 || Mount Lemmon || Mount Lemmon Survey || — || align=right | 2.1 km || 
|-id=890 bgcolor=#fefefe
| 493890 ||  || — || September 18, 2011 || Mount Lemmon || Mount Lemmon Survey || MAS || align=right data-sort-value="0.63" | 630 m || 
|-id=891 bgcolor=#fefefe
| 493891 ||  || — || October 24, 2011 || Kitt Peak || Spacewatch || critical || align=right data-sort-value="0.78" | 780 m || 
|-id=892 bgcolor=#d6d6d6
| 493892 ||  || — || November 11, 2010 || Mount Lemmon || Mount Lemmon Survey || — || align=right | 1.8 km || 
|-id=893 bgcolor=#d6d6d6
| 493893 ||  || — || April 11, 2013 || Mount Lemmon || Mount Lemmon Survey || — || align=right | 2.2 km || 
|-id=894 bgcolor=#d6d6d6
| 493894 ||  || — || August 22, 2014 || Haleakala || Pan-STARRS || — || align=right | 2.4 km || 
|-id=895 bgcolor=#d6d6d6
| 493895 ||  || — || January 14, 2011 || Mount Lemmon || Mount Lemmon Survey || — || align=right | 2.6 km || 
|-id=896 bgcolor=#fefefe
| 493896 ||  || — || January 20, 2009 || Mount Lemmon || Mount Lemmon Survey || — || align=right data-sort-value="0.82" | 820 m || 
|-id=897 bgcolor=#E9E9E9
| 493897 ||  || — || November 29, 2011 || Kitt Peak || Spacewatch || — || align=right | 1.3 km || 
|-id=898 bgcolor=#E9E9E9
| 493898 ||  || — || November 2, 2010 || Mount Lemmon || Mount Lemmon Survey || — || align=right | 2.2 km || 
|-id=899 bgcolor=#E9E9E9
| 493899 ||  || — || January 10, 2008 || Mount Lemmon || Mount Lemmon Survey || — || align=right | 1.1 km || 
|-id=900 bgcolor=#E9E9E9
| 493900 ||  || — || April 16, 2013 || Haleakala || Pan-STARRS || EUN || align=right | 1.4 km || 
|}

493901–494000 

|-bgcolor=#fefefe
| 493901 ||  || — || September 25, 2011 || Haleakala || Pan-STARRS || V || align=right data-sort-value="0.61" | 610 m || 
|-id=902 bgcolor=#fefefe
| 493902 ||  || — || October 21, 2011 || Haleakala || Pan-STARRS || — || align=right data-sort-value="0.84" | 840 m || 
|-id=903 bgcolor=#d6d6d6
| 493903 ||  || — || October 25, 2005 || Mount Lemmon || Mount Lemmon Survey || KOR || align=right | 1.2 km || 
|-id=904 bgcolor=#E9E9E9
| 493904 ||  || — || January 15, 2004 || Kitt Peak || Spacewatch || — || align=right data-sort-value="0.86" | 860 m || 
|-id=905 bgcolor=#E9E9E9
| 493905 ||  || — || May 8, 2013 || Haleakala || Pan-STARRS || — || align=right | 1.0 km || 
|-id=906 bgcolor=#fefefe
| 493906 ||  || — || December 29, 2008 || Mount Lemmon || Mount Lemmon Survey || — || align=right data-sort-value="0.59" | 590 m || 
|-id=907 bgcolor=#E9E9E9
| 493907 ||  || — || January 18, 2008 || Mount Lemmon || Mount Lemmon Survey || — || align=right | 1.3 km || 
|-id=908 bgcolor=#d6d6d6
| 493908 ||  || — || May 10, 2007 || Kitt Peak || Spacewatch || EOS || align=right | 2.2 km || 
|-id=909 bgcolor=#fefefe
| 493909 ||  || — || April 7, 2006 || Kitt Peak || Spacewatch || — || align=right data-sort-value="0.64" | 640 m || 
|-id=910 bgcolor=#d6d6d6
| 493910 ||  || — || September 20, 2009 || Kitt Peak || Spacewatch || — || align=right | 2.7 km || 
|-id=911 bgcolor=#d6d6d6
| 493911 ||  || — || December 26, 2005 || Kitt Peak || Spacewatch || — || align=right | 2.2 km || 
|-id=912 bgcolor=#fefefe
| 493912 ||  || — || October 25, 2011 || Haleakala || Pan-STARRS || V || align=right data-sort-value="0.68" | 680 m || 
|-id=913 bgcolor=#d6d6d6
| 493913 ||  || — || August 28, 2014 || Haleakala || Pan-STARRS || EOS || align=right | 1.7 km || 
|-id=914 bgcolor=#d6d6d6
| 493914 ||  || — || August 28, 2014 || Haleakala || Pan-STARRS || — || align=right | 3.2 km || 
|-id=915 bgcolor=#d6d6d6
| 493915 ||  || — || April 25, 2007 || Mount Lemmon || Mount Lemmon Survey || — || align=right | 3.0 km || 
|-id=916 bgcolor=#E9E9E9
| 493916 ||  || — || November 16, 2006 || Mount Lemmon || Mount Lemmon Survey || — || align=right | 2.1 km || 
|-id=917 bgcolor=#E9E9E9
| 493917 ||  || — || August 20, 2014 || Haleakala || Pan-STARRS || AST || align=right | 1.4 km || 
|-id=918 bgcolor=#E9E9E9
| 493918 ||  || — || August 18, 2014 || Haleakala || Pan-STARRS || — || align=right | 1.6 km || 
|-id=919 bgcolor=#E9E9E9
| 493919 ||  || — || April 13, 2013 || Haleakala || Pan-STARRS || — || align=right | 2.0 km || 
|-id=920 bgcolor=#d6d6d6
| 493920 ||  || — || August 22, 2014 || Haleakala || Pan-STARRS || — || align=right | 2.6 km || 
|-id=921 bgcolor=#d6d6d6
| 493921 ||  || — || October 15, 2009 || Kitt Peak || Spacewatch || — || align=right | 3.0 km || 
|-id=922 bgcolor=#E9E9E9
| 493922 ||  || — || July 30, 2014 || Kitt Peak || Spacewatch || AGN || align=right | 1.3 km || 
|-id=923 bgcolor=#E9E9E9
| 493923 ||  || — || November 18, 2006 || Kitt Peak || Spacewatch || NEM || align=right | 1.7 km || 
|-id=924 bgcolor=#d6d6d6
| 493924 ||  || — || August 3, 2014 || Haleakala || Pan-STARRS || — || align=right | 1.8 km || 
|-id=925 bgcolor=#d6d6d6
| 493925 ||  || — || November 20, 2009 || Mount Lemmon || Mount Lemmon Survey || — || align=right | 2.8 km || 
|-id=926 bgcolor=#d6d6d6
| 493926 ||  || — || June 10, 2007 || Kitt Peak || Spacewatch || — || align=right | 2.9 km || 
|-id=927 bgcolor=#d6d6d6
| 493927 ||  || — || January 26, 2011 || Kitt Peak || Spacewatch || HYG || align=right | 2.4 km || 
|-id=928 bgcolor=#E9E9E9
| 493928 ||  || — || October 2, 2006 || Mount Lemmon || Mount Lemmon Survey || — || align=right | 1.2 km || 
|-id=929 bgcolor=#d6d6d6
| 493929 ||  || — || February 2, 2006 || Kitt Peak || Spacewatch || — || align=right | 2.8 km || 
|-id=930 bgcolor=#E9E9E9
| 493930 ||  || — || February 7, 2008 || Mount Lemmon || Mount Lemmon Survey || — || align=right | 1.2 km || 
|-id=931 bgcolor=#E9E9E9
| 493931 ||  || — || December 19, 2003 || Kitt Peak || Spacewatch || — || align=right data-sort-value="0.94" | 940 m || 
|-id=932 bgcolor=#E9E9E9
| 493932 ||  || — || April 27, 2009 || Kitt Peak || Spacewatch || — || align=right | 1.4 km || 
|-id=933 bgcolor=#d6d6d6
| 493933 ||  || — || August 3, 2014 || Haleakala || Pan-STARRS || — || align=right | 2.0 km || 
|-id=934 bgcolor=#E9E9E9
| 493934 ||  || — || October 10, 2010 || Mount Lemmon || Mount Lemmon Survey || — || align=right | 2.4 km || 
|-id=935 bgcolor=#E9E9E9
| 493935 ||  || — || October 26, 2005 || Kitt Peak || Spacewatch || — || align=right | 2.6 km || 
|-id=936 bgcolor=#fefefe
| 493936 ||  || — || November 30, 1999 || Kitt Peak || Spacewatch || — || align=right data-sort-value="0.98" | 980 m || 
|-id=937 bgcolor=#d6d6d6
| 493937 ||  || — || February 23, 2011 || Catalina || CSS || — || align=right | 3.6 km || 
|-id=938 bgcolor=#d6d6d6
| 493938 ||  || — || November 8, 2009 || Kitt Peak || Spacewatch || EOS || align=right | 1.8 km || 
|-id=939 bgcolor=#d6d6d6
| 493939 ||  || — || March 13, 2012 || Mount Lemmon || Mount Lemmon Survey || KOR || align=right | 1.4 km || 
|-id=940 bgcolor=#d6d6d6
| 493940 ||  || — || December 3, 2004 || Kitt Peak || Spacewatch || THM || align=right | 2.0 km || 
|-id=941 bgcolor=#E9E9E9
| 493941 ||  || — || May 30, 2008 || Mount Lemmon || Mount Lemmon Survey || — || align=right | 1.6 km || 
|-id=942 bgcolor=#d6d6d6
| 493942 ||  || — || April 22, 2012 || Mount Lemmon || Mount Lemmon Survey || — || align=right | 3.5 km || 
|-id=943 bgcolor=#d6d6d6
| 493943 ||  || — || March 4, 2010 || WISE || WISE || — || align=right | 3.5 km || 
|-id=944 bgcolor=#d6d6d6
| 493944 ||  || — || December 5, 2010 || Mount Lemmon || Mount Lemmon Survey || EOS || align=right | 2.4 km || 
|-id=945 bgcolor=#d6d6d6
| 493945 ||  || — || January 30, 2011 || Haleakala || Pan-STARRS || — || align=right | 2.9 km || 
|-id=946 bgcolor=#E9E9E9
| 493946 ||  || — || December 17, 2003 || Kitt Peak || Spacewatch || — || align=right data-sort-value="0.91" | 910 m || 
|-id=947 bgcolor=#d6d6d6
| 493947 ||  || — || February 28, 2012 || Haleakala || Pan-STARRS || KOR || align=right | 1.2 km || 
|-id=948 bgcolor=#d6d6d6
| 493948 ||  || — || September 3, 2008 || Kitt Peak || Spacewatch || — || align=right | 2.9 km || 
|-id=949 bgcolor=#E9E9E9
| 493949 ||  || — || June 11, 2004 || Kitt Peak || Spacewatch || — || align=right | 2.4 km || 
|-id=950 bgcolor=#d6d6d6
| 493950 ||  || — || November 8, 2009 || Mount Lemmon || Mount Lemmon Survey || — || align=right | 2.9 km || 
|-id=951 bgcolor=#E9E9E9
| 493951 ||  || — || April 10, 2003 || Kitt Peak || Spacewatch || — || align=right | 2.4 km || 
|-id=952 bgcolor=#E9E9E9
| 493952 ||  || — || April 14, 2008 || Mount Lemmon || Mount Lemmon Survey || — || align=right | 1.8 km || 
|-id=953 bgcolor=#d6d6d6
| 493953 ||  || — || March 25, 2011 || Haleakala || Pan-STARRS || — || align=right | 2.8 km || 
|-id=954 bgcolor=#d6d6d6
| 493954 ||  || — || February 3, 2010 || WISE || WISE || HYG || align=right | 3.5 km || 
|-id=955 bgcolor=#d6d6d6
| 493955 ||  || — || March 10, 2007 || Mount Lemmon || Mount Lemmon Survey || KOR || align=right | 1.4 km || 
|-id=956 bgcolor=#d6d6d6
| 493956 ||  || — || May 21, 2006 || Kitt Peak || Spacewatch || — || align=right | 3.9 km || 
|-id=957 bgcolor=#d6d6d6
| 493957 ||  || — || January 6, 2006 || Mount Lemmon || Mount Lemmon Survey || KOR || align=right | 1.5 km || 
|-id=958 bgcolor=#d6d6d6
| 493958 ||  || — || December 7, 2005 || Kitt Peak || Spacewatch || KOR || align=right | 1.2 km || 
|-id=959 bgcolor=#d6d6d6
| 493959 ||  || — || May 14, 2012 || Mount Lemmon || Mount Lemmon Survey || — || align=right | 3.0 km || 
|-id=960 bgcolor=#E9E9E9
| 493960 ||  || — || June 20, 2004 || Kitt Peak || Spacewatch || HOF || align=right | 3.6 km || 
|-id=961 bgcolor=#d6d6d6
| 493961 ||  || — || February 7, 2010 || WISE || WISE || — || align=right | 2.8 km || 
|-id=962 bgcolor=#d6d6d6
| 493962 ||  || — || January 30, 2011 || Haleakala || Pan-STARRS || — || align=right | 2.7 km || 
|-id=963 bgcolor=#E9E9E9
| 493963 ||  || — || July 27, 2009 || Kitt Peak || Spacewatch || — || align=right | 2.0 km || 
|-id=964 bgcolor=#fefefe
| 493964 ||  || — || November 18, 2007 || Mount Lemmon || Mount Lemmon Survey || — || align=right data-sort-value="0.84" | 840 m || 
|-id=965 bgcolor=#d6d6d6
| 493965 ||  || — || May 18, 2012 || Haleakala || Pan-STARRS || — || align=right | 2.9 km || 
|-id=966 bgcolor=#d6d6d6
| 493966 ||  || — || June 20, 2013 || Haleakala || Pan-STARRS || — || align=right | 3.4 km || 
|-id=967 bgcolor=#d6d6d6
| 493967 ||  || — || November 22, 2009 || Kitt Peak || Spacewatch || — || align=right | 3.6 km || 
|-id=968 bgcolor=#E9E9E9
| 493968 ||  || — || March 28, 2008 || Mount Lemmon || Mount Lemmon Survey || — || align=right | 1.4 km || 
|-id=969 bgcolor=#d6d6d6
| 493969 ||  || — || February 12, 2010 || WISE || WISE || — || align=right | 2.5 km || 
|-id=970 bgcolor=#d6d6d6
| 493970 ||  || — || February 5, 2011 || Catalina || CSS || — || align=right | 2.7 km || 
|-id=971 bgcolor=#d6d6d6
| 493971 ||  || — || February 25, 2010 || WISE || WISE || — || align=right | 3.4 km || 
|-id=972 bgcolor=#d6d6d6
| 493972 ||  || — || October 9, 1999 || Socorro || LINEAR || — || align=right | 2.4 km || 
|-id=973 bgcolor=#d6d6d6
| 493973 ||  || — || June 7, 2008 || Kitt Peak || Spacewatch || EOS || align=right | 2.5 km || 
|-id=974 bgcolor=#d6d6d6
| 493974 ||  || — || October 22, 2008 || Kitt Peak || Spacewatch || — || align=right | 3.5 km || 
|-id=975 bgcolor=#d6d6d6
| 493975 ||  || — || December 10, 2009 || Mount Lemmon || Mount Lemmon Survey || — || align=right | 3.0 km || 
|-id=976 bgcolor=#d6d6d6
| 493976 ||  || — || March 27, 2011 || Kitt Peak || Spacewatch || — || align=right | 2.7 km || 
|-id=977 bgcolor=#d6d6d6
| 493977 ||  || — || February 11, 1994 || Kitt Peak || Spacewatch ||  || align=right | 2.7 km || 
|-id=978 bgcolor=#d6d6d6
| 493978 ||  || — || August 2, 2013 || Haleakala || Pan-STARRS || — || align=right | 3.6 km || 
|-id=979 bgcolor=#d6d6d6
| 493979 ||  || — || August 20, 2014 || Haleakala || Pan-STARRS || — || align=right | 3.0 km || 
|-id=980 bgcolor=#d6d6d6
| 493980 ||  || — || February 19, 2010 || WISE || WISE || — || align=right | 6.0 km || 
|-id=981 bgcolor=#E9E9E9
| 493981 ||  || — || March 15, 2012 || Mount Lemmon || Mount Lemmon Survey || HOF || align=right | 2.5 km || 
|-id=982 bgcolor=#E9E9E9
| 493982 ||  || — || December 15, 2006 || Kitt Peak || Spacewatch || — || align=right | 2.1 km || 
|-id=983 bgcolor=#E9E9E9
| 493983 ||  || — || November 8, 2010 || Mount Lemmon || Mount Lemmon Survey || — || align=right | 2.1 km || 
|-id=984 bgcolor=#d6d6d6
| 493984 ||  || — || January 8, 2011 || Mount Lemmon || Mount Lemmon Survey || VER || align=right | 2.8 km || 
|-id=985 bgcolor=#E9E9E9
| 493985 ||  || — || October 3, 2014 || Mount Lemmon || Mount Lemmon Survey || — || align=right | 1.8 km || 
|-id=986 bgcolor=#E9E9E9
| 493986 ||  || — || September 24, 2009 || Mount Lemmon || Mount Lemmon Survey || AGN || align=right | 1.2 km || 
|-id=987 bgcolor=#E9E9E9
| 493987 ||  || — || July 13, 2013 || Haleakala || Pan-STARRS || — || align=right | 2.2 km || 
|-id=988 bgcolor=#d6d6d6
| 493988 ||  || — || October 23, 2003 || Kitt Peak || Spacewatch || — || align=right | 2.5 km || 
|-id=989 bgcolor=#E9E9E9
| 493989 ||  || — || February 23, 2007 || Catalina || CSS || — || align=right | 3.2 km || 
|-id=990 bgcolor=#d6d6d6
| 493990 ||  || — || July 14, 2013 || Haleakala || Pan-STARRS || EOS || align=right | 1.7 km || 
|-id=991 bgcolor=#d6d6d6
| 493991 ||  || — || July 13, 2013 || Haleakala || Pan-STARRS || — || align=right | 2.7 km || 
|-id=992 bgcolor=#d6d6d6
| 493992 ||  || — || November 23, 2014 || Haleakala || Pan-STARRS || — || align=right | 2.6 km || 
|-id=993 bgcolor=#E9E9E9
| 493993 ||  || — || January 25, 2007 || Kitt Peak || Spacewatch || — || align=right | 1.8 km || 
|-id=994 bgcolor=#E9E9E9
| 493994 ||  || — || August 6, 2014 || Haleakala || Pan-STARRS || — || align=right | 1.1 km || 
|-id=995 bgcolor=#d6d6d6
| 493995 ||  || — || March 9, 2011 || Mount Lemmon || Mount Lemmon Survey || HYG || align=right | 2.9 km || 
|-id=996 bgcolor=#d6d6d6
| 493996 ||  || — || June 22, 2007 || Kitt Peak || Spacewatch || — || align=right | 4.2 km || 
|-id=997 bgcolor=#d6d6d6
| 493997 ||  || — || February 13, 2011 || Mount Lemmon || Mount Lemmon Survey || — || align=right | 3.0 km || 
|-id=998 bgcolor=#d6d6d6
| 493998 ||  || — || May 19, 2012 || Mount Lemmon || Mount Lemmon Survey || — || align=right | 2.7 km || 
|-id=999 bgcolor=#d6d6d6
| 493999 ||  || — || March 4, 2005 || Mount Lemmon || Mount Lemmon Survey || — || align=right | 3.5 km || 
|-id=000 bgcolor=#d6d6d6
| 494000 ||  || — || April 21, 2012 || Mount Lemmon || Mount Lemmon Survey || — || align=right | 2.3 km || 
|}

References

External links 
 Discovery Circumstances: Numbered Minor Planets (490001)–(495000) (IAU Minor Planet Center)

0493